

283001–283100 

|-bgcolor=#E9E9E9
| 283001 ||  || — || October 15, 2007 || Catalina || CSS || — || align=right | 2.6 km || 
|-id=002 bgcolor=#d6d6d6
| 283002 ||  || — || October 13, 2007 || Kitt Peak || Spacewatch || — || align=right | 3.9 km || 
|-id=003 bgcolor=#d6d6d6
| 283003 ||  || — || October 14, 2007 || Mount Lemmon || Mount Lemmon Survey || — || align=right | 2.6 km || 
|-id=004 bgcolor=#d6d6d6
| 283004 ||  || — || October 14, 2007 || Catalina || CSS || — || align=right | 4.9 km || 
|-id=005 bgcolor=#E9E9E9
| 283005 ||  || — || October 14, 2007 || Catalina || CSS || — || align=right | 2.5 km || 
|-id=006 bgcolor=#E9E9E9
| 283006 ||  || — || October 8, 2007 || Anderson Mesa || LONEOS || — || align=right | 3.0 km || 
|-id=007 bgcolor=#fefefe
| 283007 || 2007 UF || — || October 16, 2007 || Bisei SG Center || BATTeRS || — || align=right data-sort-value="0.75" | 750 m || 
|-id=008 bgcolor=#E9E9E9
| 283008 ||  || — || October 20, 2007 || Catalina || CSS || — || align=right | 2.8 km || 
|-id=009 bgcolor=#E9E9E9
| 283009 ||  || — || October 24, 2007 || Mount Lemmon || Mount Lemmon Survey || — || align=right | 1.6 km || 
|-id=010 bgcolor=#E9E9E9
| 283010 ||  || — || October 30, 2007 || Kitt Peak || Spacewatch || — || align=right | 2.3 km || 
|-id=011 bgcolor=#d6d6d6
| 283011 ||  || — || October 31, 2007 || Kitt Peak || Spacewatch || EOS || align=right | 2.8 km || 
|-id=012 bgcolor=#d6d6d6
| 283012 ||  || — || November 2, 2007 || Catalina || CSS || — || align=right | 5.9 km || 
|-id=013 bgcolor=#d6d6d6
| 283013 ||  || — || November 1, 2007 || Kitt Peak || Spacewatch || — || align=right | 3.7 km || 
|-id=014 bgcolor=#E9E9E9
| 283014 ||  || — || November 7, 2007 || Socorro || LINEAR || — || align=right | 1.4 km || 
|-id=015 bgcolor=#fefefe
| 283015 ||  || — || November 2, 2007 || Kitt Peak || Spacewatch || — || align=right data-sort-value="0.62" | 620 m || 
|-id=016 bgcolor=#d6d6d6
| 283016 ||  || — || November 5, 2007 || Mount Lemmon || Mount Lemmon Survey || — || align=right | 3.5 km || 
|-id=017 bgcolor=#d6d6d6
| 283017 ||  || — || November 11, 2007 || Bisei SG Center || BATTeRS || EOS || align=right | 2.8 km || 
|-id=018 bgcolor=#E9E9E9
| 283018 ||  || — || November 5, 2007 || Kitt Peak || Spacewatch || — || align=right | 2.6 km || 
|-id=019 bgcolor=#E9E9E9
| 283019 ||  || — || November 8, 2007 || Catalina || CSS || EUN || align=right | 1.7 km || 
|-id=020 bgcolor=#fefefe
| 283020 ||  || — || November 4, 2007 || Mount Lemmon || Mount Lemmon Survey || — || align=right data-sort-value="0.87" | 870 m || 
|-id=021 bgcolor=#d6d6d6
| 283021 ||  || — || November 11, 2007 || Catalina || CSS || — || align=right | 4.1 km || 
|-id=022 bgcolor=#d6d6d6
| 283022 ||  || — || November 8, 2007 || Purple Mountain || PMO NEO || EUP || align=right | 4.7 km || 
|-id=023 bgcolor=#d6d6d6
| 283023 ||  || — || November 13, 2007 || Catalina || CSS || — || align=right | 5.5 km || 
|-id=024 bgcolor=#d6d6d6
| 283024 ||  || — || November 9, 2007 || Socorro || LINEAR || — || align=right | 3.9 km || 
|-id=025 bgcolor=#d6d6d6
| 283025 ||  || — || November 14, 2007 || Socorro || LINEAR || — || align=right | 3.9 km || 
|-id=026 bgcolor=#d6d6d6
| 283026 ||  || — || November 14, 2007 || Kitt Peak || Spacewatch || — || align=right | 6.2 km || 
|-id=027 bgcolor=#d6d6d6
| 283027 ||  || — || November 3, 2007 || Catalina || CSS || — || align=right | 4.1 km || 
|-id=028 bgcolor=#fefefe
| 283028 ||  || — || November 8, 2007 || Mount Lemmon || Mount Lemmon Survey || — || align=right data-sort-value="0.80" | 800 m || 
|-id=029 bgcolor=#d6d6d6
| 283029 ||  || — || November 18, 2007 || Bisei SG Center || BATTeRS || EOS || align=right | 2.2 km || 
|-id=030 bgcolor=#d6d6d6
| 283030 ||  || — || November 18, 2007 || Socorro || LINEAR || EOS || align=right | 2.8 km || 
|-id=031 bgcolor=#E9E9E9
| 283031 ||  || — || November 18, 2007 || Mount Lemmon || Mount Lemmon Survey || — || align=right | 3.0 km || 
|-id=032 bgcolor=#d6d6d6
| 283032 ||  || — || November 18, 2007 || Mount Lemmon || Mount Lemmon Survey || — || align=right | 3.9 km || 
|-id=033 bgcolor=#d6d6d6
| 283033 ||  || — || November 18, 2007 || Catalina || CSS || — || align=right | 5.2 km || 
|-id=034 bgcolor=#d6d6d6
| 283034 ||  || — || December 7, 2007 || Pla D'Arguines || R. Ferrando || — || align=right | 4.9 km || 
|-id=035 bgcolor=#d6d6d6
| 283035 ||  || — || December 15, 2007 || Catalina || CSS || — || align=right | 4.1 km || 
|-id=036 bgcolor=#E9E9E9
| 283036 ||  || — || December 30, 2007 || Anderson Mesa || LONEOS || — || align=right | 3.5 km || 
|-id=037 bgcolor=#d6d6d6
| 283037 ||  || — || January 16, 2008 || Kitt Peak || Spacewatch || — || align=right | 3.6 km || 
|-id=038 bgcolor=#d6d6d6
| 283038 ||  || — || January 28, 2008 || Altschwendt || W. Ries || — || align=right | 3.5 km || 
|-id=039 bgcolor=#fefefe
| 283039 ||  || — || January 30, 2008 || Catalina || CSS || FLO || align=right data-sort-value="0.77" | 770 m || 
|-id=040 bgcolor=#E9E9E9
| 283040 ||  || — || January 30, 2008 || Mount Lemmon || Mount Lemmon Survey || — || align=right | 2.2 km || 
|-id=041 bgcolor=#fefefe
| 283041 ||  || — || February 2, 2008 || Catalina || CSS || H || align=right data-sort-value="0.98" | 980 m || 
|-id=042 bgcolor=#fefefe
| 283042 ||  || — || February 11, 2008 || Catalina || CSS || H || align=right data-sort-value="0.90" | 900 m || 
|-id=043 bgcolor=#fefefe
| 283043 ||  || — || February 26, 2008 || Mount Lemmon || Mount Lemmon Survey || FLO || align=right data-sort-value="0.74" | 740 m || 
|-id=044 bgcolor=#fefefe
| 283044 ||  || — || February 29, 2008 || Kitt Peak || Spacewatch || — || align=right | 1.6 km || 
|-id=045 bgcolor=#fefefe
| 283045 ||  || — || March 1, 2008 || Kitt Peak || Spacewatch || — || align=right data-sort-value="0.78" | 780 m || 
|-id=046 bgcolor=#d6d6d6
| 283046 ||  || — || March 3, 2008 || Catalina || CSS || — || align=right | 3.8 km || 
|-id=047 bgcolor=#fefefe
| 283047 ||  || — || March 13, 2008 || Catalina || CSS || H || align=right | 1.1 km || 
|-id=048 bgcolor=#fefefe
| 283048 ||  || — || March 13, 2008 || Catalina || CSS || — || align=right | 1.1 km || 
|-id=049 bgcolor=#fefefe
| 283049 ||  || — || March 2, 2008 || Kitt Peak || Spacewatch || — || align=right data-sort-value="0.95" | 950 m || 
|-id=050 bgcolor=#d6d6d6
| 283050 ||  || — || March 27, 2008 || Kitt Peak || Spacewatch || — || align=right | 3.9 km || 
|-id=051 bgcolor=#d6d6d6
| 283051 ||  || — || March 29, 2008 || Kitt Peak || Spacewatch || — || align=right | 5.8 km || 
|-id=052 bgcolor=#d6d6d6
| 283052 ||  || — || April 3, 2008 || Kitt Peak || Spacewatch || — || align=right | 4.2 km || 
|-id=053 bgcolor=#fefefe
| 283053 ||  || — || April 12, 2008 || Catalina || CSS || ERI || align=right | 2.0 km || 
|-id=054 bgcolor=#E9E9E9
| 283054 ||  || — || April 26, 2008 || Kitt Peak || Spacewatch || — || align=right | 2.4 km || 
|-id=055 bgcolor=#d6d6d6
| 283055 ||  || — || April 28, 2008 || Mount Lemmon || Mount Lemmon Survey || — || align=right | 3.2 km || 
|-id=056 bgcolor=#E9E9E9
| 283056 || 2008 OH || — || July 25, 2008 || La Sagra || OAM Obs. || — || align=right | 1.5 km || 
|-id=057 bgcolor=#fefefe
| 283057 Casteldipiazza ||  ||  || July 24, 2008 || San Marcello || G. Fagioli, L. Tesi || — || align=right data-sort-value="0.98" | 980 m || 
|-id=058 bgcolor=#E9E9E9
| 283058 ||  || — || July 30, 2008 || Mount Lemmon || Mount Lemmon Survey || HNS || align=right | 1.5 km || 
|-id=059 bgcolor=#fefefe
| 283059 ||  || — || August 7, 2008 || Kitt Peak || Spacewatch || — || align=right | 1.1 km || 
|-id=060 bgcolor=#fefefe
| 283060 ||  || — || August 25, 2008 || Pla D'Arguines || R. Ferrando || — || align=right data-sort-value="0.91" | 910 m || 
|-id=061 bgcolor=#fefefe
| 283061 ||  || — || August 25, 2008 || Reedy Creek || J. Broughton || — || align=right data-sort-value="0.95" | 950 m || 
|-id=062 bgcolor=#fefefe
| 283062 ||  || — || August 27, 2008 || La Sagra || OAM Obs. || — || align=right data-sort-value="0.96" | 960 m || 
|-id=063 bgcolor=#fefefe
| 283063 ||  || — || August 27, 2008 || La Sagra || OAM Obs. || — || align=right data-sort-value="0.69" | 690 m || 
|-id=064 bgcolor=#fefefe
| 283064 ||  || — || August 30, 2008 || Socorro || LINEAR || — || align=right | 1.1 km || 
|-id=065 bgcolor=#fefefe
| 283065 ||  || — || September 2, 2008 || Kitt Peak || Spacewatch || NYS || align=right data-sort-value="0.58" | 580 m || 
|-id=066 bgcolor=#E9E9E9
| 283066 ||  || — || September 2, 2008 || Kitt Peak || Spacewatch || — || align=right | 2.3 km || 
|-id=067 bgcolor=#fefefe
| 283067 ||  || — || September 2, 2008 || Kitt Peak || Spacewatch || — || align=right data-sort-value="0.60" | 600 m || 
|-id=068 bgcolor=#E9E9E9
| 283068 ||  || — || September 7, 2008 || Mount Lemmon || Mount Lemmon Survey || GER || align=right | 3.1 km || 
|-id=069 bgcolor=#fefefe
| 283069 ||  || — || September 4, 2008 || Kitt Peak || Spacewatch || CLA || align=right | 1.8 km || 
|-id=070 bgcolor=#fefefe
| 283070 ||  || — || September 6, 2008 || Catalina || CSS || — || align=right | 1.2 km || 
|-id=071 bgcolor=#fefefe
| 283071 ||  || — || September 6, 2008 || Kitt Peak || Spacewatch || — || align=right data-sort-value="0.92" | 920 m || 
|-id=072 bgcolor=#fefefe
| 283072 ||  || — || September 19, 2008 || Socorro || LINEAR || FLO || align=right data-sort-value="0.85" | 850 m || 
|-id=073 bgcolor=#fefefe
| 283073 ||  || — || September 21, 2008 || Vicques || M. Ory || — || align=right data-sort-value="0.86" | 860 m || 
|-id=074 bgcolor=#E9E9E9
| 283074 ||  || — || September 21, 2008 || Kitt Peak || Spacewatch || — || align=right | 1.7 km || 
|-id=075 bgcolor=#d6d6d6
| 283075 ||  || — || September 20, 2008 || Kitt Peak || Spacewatch || EOS || align=right | 2.7 km || 
|-id=076 bgcolor=#fefefe
| 283076 ||  || — || September 23, 2008 || Socorro || LINEAR || — || align=right | 1.2 km || 
|-id=077 bgcolor=#fefefe
| 283077 ||  || — || September 23, 2008 || Catalina || CSS || — || align=right data-sort-value="0.80" | 800 m || 
|-id=078 bgcolor=#fefefe
| 283078 ||  || — || September 23, 2008 || Mount Lemmon || Mount Lemmon Survey || FLO || align=right data-sort-value="0.77" | 770 m || 
|-id=079 bgcolor=#E9E9E9
| 283079 ||  || — || September 29, 2008 || Kitt Peak || Spacewatch || — || align=right | 2.1 km || 
|-id=080 bgcolor=#fefefe
| 283080 ||  || — || September 29, 2008 || Catalina || CSS || V || align=right data-sort-value="0.67" | 670 m || 
|-id=081 bgcolor=#fefefe
| 283081 ||  || — || September 23, 2008 || Catalina || CSS || — || align=right data-sort-value="0.87" | 870 m || 
|-id=082 bgcolor=#d6d6d6
| 283082 ||  || — || September 30, 2008 || Mount Lemmon || Mount Lemmon Survey || — || align=right | 4.5 km || 
|-id=083 bgcolor=#E9E9E9
| 283083 ||  || — || September 24, 2008 || Mount Lemmon || Mount Lemmon Survey || WIT || align=right | 1.1 km || 
|-id=084 bgcolor=#fefefe
| 283084 ||  || — || October 7, 2008 || Calvin-Rehoboth || L. A. Molnar || NYS || align=right data-sort-value="0.63" | 630 m || 
|-id=085 bgcolor=#fefefe
| 283085 ||  || — || October 1, 2008 || Mount Lemmon || Mount Lemmon Survey || MAS || align=right data-sort-value="0.91" | 910 m || 
|-id=086 bgcolor=#E9E9E9
| 283086 ||  || — || October 1, 2008 || Mount Lemmon || Mount Lemmon Survey || — || align=right | 2.1 km || 
|-id=087 bgcolor=#fefefe
| 283087 ||  || — || October 3, 2008 || Kitt Peak || Spacewatch || — || align=right data-sort-value="0.91" | 910 m || 
|-id=088 bgcolor=#fefefe
| 283088 ||  || — || October 5, 2008 || La Sagra || OAM Obs. || — || align=right | 1.1 km || 
|-id=089 bgcolor=#E9E9E9
| 283089 ||  || — || October 6, 2008 || Kitt Peak || Spacewatch || — || align=right | 3.0 km || 
|-id=090 bgcolor=#fefefe
| 283090 ||  || — || October 7, 2008 || Mount Lemmon || Mount Lemmon Survey || V || align=right data-sort-value="0.69" | 690 m || 
|-id=091 bgcolor=#E9E9E9
| 283091 ||  || — || October 1, 2008 || Kitt Peak || Spacewatch || — || align=right | 2.3 km || 
|-id=092 bgcolor=#E9E9E9
| 283092 ||  || — || October 20, 2008 || Kitt Peak || Spacewatch || — || align=right | 1.9 km || 
|-id=093 bgcolor=#E9E9E9
| 283093 ||  || — || October 22, 2008 || Kitt Peak || Spacewatch || MIT || align=right | 3.5 km || 
|-id=094 bgcolor=#d6d6d6
| 283094 ||  || — || October 22, 2008 || Mount Lemmon || Mount Lemmon Survey || KAR || align=right | 1.2 km || 
|-id=095 bgcolor=#E9E9E9
| 283095 ||  || — || October 27, 2008 || Bisei SG Center || BATTeRS || — || align=right | 3.0 km || 
|-id=096 bgcolor=#E9E9E9
| 283096 ||  || — || October 22, 2008 || Kitt Peak || Spacewatch || — || align=right | 1.4 km || 
|-id=097 bgcolor=#fefefe
| 283097 ||  || — || October 23, 2008 || Kitt Peak || Spacewatch || — || align=right | 1.1 km || 
|-id=098 bgcolor=#E9E9E9
| 283098 ||  || — || October 23, 2008 || Kitt Peak || Spacewatch || — || align=right | 1.5 km || 
|-id=099 bgcolor=#fefefe
| 283099 ||  || — || October 23, 2008 || Kitt Peak || Spacewatch || — || align=right data-sort-value="0.99" | 990 m || 
|-id=100 bgcolor=#E9E9E9
| 283100 ||  || — || October 23, 2008 || Kitt Peak || Spacewatch || — || align=right | 4.0 km || 
|}

283101–283200 

|-bgcolor=#fefefe
| 283101 ||  || — || October 24, 2008 || Catalina || CSS || — || align=right | 1.2 km || 
|-id=102 bgcolor=#E9E9E9
| 283102 ||  || — || October 24, 2008 || Mount Lemmon || Mount Lemmon Survey || — || align=right | 3.3 km || 
|-id=103 bgcolor=#E9E9E9
| 283103 ||  || — || October 24, 2008 || Kitt Peak || Spacewatch || MRX || align=right | 1.2 km || 
|-id=104 bgcolor=#fefefe
| 283104 ||  || — || October 25, 2008 || Kitt Peak || Spacewatch || — || align=right data-sort-value="0.65" | 650 m || 
|-id=105 bgcolor=#fefefe
| 283105 ||  || — || October 23, 2008 || Kitt Peak || Spacewatch || — || align=right | 1.0 km || 
|-id=106 bgcolor=#E9E9E9
| 283106 ||  || — || October 26, 2008 || Kitt Peak || Spacewatch || GER || align=right | 2.7 km || 
|-id=107 bgcolor=#E9E9E9
| 283107 ||  || — || October 27, 2008 || Mount Lemmon || Mount Lemmon Survey || — || align=right | 1.6 km || 
|-id=108 bgcolor=#fefefe
| 283108 ||  || — || October 28, 2008 || Kitt Peak || Spacewatch || V || align=right | 1.2 km || 
|-id=109 bgcolor=#E9E9E9
| 283109 ||  || — || October 28, 2008 || Catalina || CSS || EUN || align=right | 1.5 km || 
|-id=110 bgcolor=#d6d6d6
| 283110 ||  || — || October 28, 2008 || Kitt Peak || Spacewatch || EOS || align=right | 2.5 km || 
|-id=111 bgcolor=#E9E9E9
| 283111 ||  || — || October 29, 2008 || Kitt Peak || Spacewatch || EUN || align=right | 1.9 km || 
|-id=112 bgcolor=#fefefe
| 283112 ||  || — || October 29, 2008 || Mount Lemmon || Mount Lemmon Survey || — || align=right | 1.1 km || 
|-id=113 bgcolor=#fefefe
| 283113 ||  || — || October 20, 2008 || Kitt Peak || Spacewatch || — || align=right | 1.6 km || 
|-id=114 bgcolor=#fefefe
| 283114 ||  || — || October 28, 2008 || Mount Lemmon || Mount Lemmon Survey || — || align=right | 1.2 km || 
|-id=115 bgcolor=#d6d6d6
| 283115 ||  || — || October 23, 2008 || Mount Lemmon || Mount Lemmon Survey || KOR || align=right | 1.6 km || 
|-id=116 bgcolor=#E9E9E9
| 283116 ||  || — || October 30, 2008 || Catalina || CSS || — || align=right | 3.0 km || 
|-id=117 bgcolor=#E9E9E9
| 283117 || 2008 VU || — || November 1, 2008 || Tzec Maun || E. Schwab || — || align=right | 4.5 km || 
|-id=118 bgcolor=#E9E9E9
| 283118 || 2008 VX || — || November 1, 2008 || Needville || J. Dellinger, C. Sexton || — || align=right | 1.7 km || 
|-id=119 bgcolor=#E9E9E9
| 283119 ||  || — || November 1, 2008 || Kitt Peak || Spacewatch || — || align=right | 2.0 km || 
|-id=120 bgcolor=#d6d6d6
| 283120 ||  || — || November 1, 2008 || Mount Lemmon || Mount Lemmon Survey || KAR || align=right | 1.8 km || 
|-id=121 bgcolor=#E9E9E9
| 283121 ||  || — || November 4, 2008 || Kitt Peak || Spacewatch || — || align=right | 1.9 km || 
|-id=122 bgcolor=#E9E9E9
| 283122 ||  || — || November 6, 2008 || Catalina || CSS || — || align=right | 2.8 km || 
|-id=123 bgcolor=#E9E9E9
| 283123 ||  || — || November 6, 2008 || Mount Lemmon || Mount Lemmon Survey || — || align=right | 1.9 km || 
|-id=124 bgcolor=#E9E9E9
| 283124 ||  || — || November 7, 2008 || Catalina || CSS || — || align=right | 1.9 km || 
|-id=125 bgcolor=#d6d6d6
| 283125 ||  || — || November 17, 2008 || Kitt Peak || Spacewatch || — || align=right | 3.0 km || 
|-id=126 bgcolor=#d6d6d6
| 283126 ||  || — || November 17, 2008 || Kitt Peak || Spacewatch || KOR || align=right | 1.6 km || 
|-id=127 bgcolor=#fefefe
| 283127 ||  || — || November 17, 2008 || Kitt Peak || Spacewatch || — || align=right | 1.2 km || 
|-id=128 bgcolor=#d6d6d6
| 283128 ||  || — || November 18, 2008 || Kitt Peak || Spacewatch || — || align=right | 2.7 km || 
|-id=129 bgcolor=#d6d6d6
| 283129 ||  || — || November 20, 2008 || Kitt Peak || Spacewatch || — || align=right | 3.1 km || 
|-id=130 bgcolor=#d6d6d6
| 283130 ||  || — || November 20, 2008 || Mount Lemmon || Mount Lemmon Survey || — || align=right | 5.3 km || 
|-id=131 bgcolor=#d6d6d6
| 283131 ||  || — || November 22, 2008 || Mount Lemmon || Mount Lemmon Survey || — || align=right | 3.6 km || 
|-id=132 bgcolor=#E9E9E9
| 283132 ||  || — || November 25, 2008 || Calvin-Rehoboth || L. A. Molnar || — || align=right | 1.9 km || 
|-id=133 bgcolor=#E9E9E9
| 283133 ||  || — || December 2, 2008 || Kitt Peak || Spacewatch || — || align=right | 2.0 km || 
|-id=134 bgcolor=#d6d6d6
| 283134 ||  || — || December 4, 2008 || Mount Lemmon || Mount Lemmon Survey || EOS || align=right | 2.3 km || 
|-id=135 bgcolor=#d6d6d6
| 283135 ||  || — || December 4, 2008 || Mount Lemmon || Mount Lemmon Survey || 7:4 || align=right | 5.9 km || 
|-id=136 bgcolor=#E9E9E9
| 283136 ||  || — || December 3, 2008 || Catalina || CSS || HNS || align=right | 1.8 km || 
|-id=137 bgcolor=#d6d6d6
| 283137 ||  || — || December 1, 2008 || Kitt Peak || Spacewatch || — || align=right | 5.0 km || 
|-id=138 bgcolor=#E9E9E9
| 283138 ||  || — || December 22, 2008 || Dauban || F. Kugel || — || align=right | 1.5 km || 
|-id=139 bgcolor=#E9E9E9
| 283139 ||  || — || December 21, 2008 || Kitt Peak || Spacewatch || — || align=right | 3.2 km || 
|-id=140 bgcolor=#E9E9E9
| 283140 ||  || — || December 28, 2008 || Mayhill || A. Lowe || — || align=right | 1.8 km || 
|-id=141 bgcolor=#E9E9E9
| 283141 Dittsche ||  ||  || December 28, 2008 || Wildberg || R. Apitzsch || GER || align=right | 2.7 km || 
|-id=142 bgcolor=#E9E9E9
| 283142 Weena ||  ||  || December 29, 2008 || Taunus || E. Schwab, R. Kling || HNS || align=right | 1.8 km || 
|-id=143 bgcolor=#d6d6d6
| 283143 ||  || — || December 31, 2008 || Bergisch Gladbach || W. Bickel || — || align=right | 5.1 km || 
|-id=144 bgcolor=#d6d6d6
| 283144 ||  || — || December 29, 2008 || Mount Lemmon || Mount Lemmon Survey || HYG || align=right | 3.5 km || 
|-id=145 bgcolor=#E9E9E9
| 283145 ||  || — || December 30, 2008 || Kitt Peak || Spacewatch || HEN || align=right | 1.3 km || 
|-id=146 bgcolor=#d6d6d6
| 283146 ||  || — || December 30, 2008 || Kitt Peak || Spacewatch || — || align=right | 2.3 km || 
|-id=147 bgcolor=#E9E9E9
| 283147 ||  || — || December 30, 2008 || Kitt Peak || Spacewatch || — || align=right | 2.9 km || 
|-id=148 bgcolor=#fefefe
| 283148 ||  || — || December 30, 2008 || Kitt Peak || Spacewatch || V || align=right data-sort-value="0.78" | 780 m || 
|-id=149 bgcolor=#d6d6d6
| 283149 ||  || — || December 30, 2008 || Kitt Peak || Spacewatch || EOS || align=right | 2.5 km || 
|-id=150 bgcolor=#d6d6d6
| 283150 ||  || — || December 21, 2008 || Kitt Peak || Spacewatch || EUP || align=right | 5.8 km || 
|-id=151 bgcolor=#d6d6d6
| 283151 ||  || — || January 1, 2009 || Purple Mountain || PMO NEO || — || align=right | 3.2 km || 
|-id=152 bgcolor=#E9E9E9
| 283152 ||  || — || January 15, 2009 || Kitt Peak || Spacewatch || WIT || align=right | 1.6 km || 
|-id=153 bgcolor=#fefefe
| 283153 ||  || — || January 3, 2009 || Mount Lemmon || Mount Lemmon Survey || V || align=right data-sort-value="0.83" | 830 m || 
|-id=154 bgcolor=#E9E9E9
| 283154 ||  || — || January 1, 2009 || Kitt Peak || Spacewatch || — || align=right | 2.4 km || 
|-id=155 bgcolor=#FA8072
| 283155 ||  || — || January 26, 2009 || Socorro || LINEAR || PHO || align=right | 1.5 km || 
|-id=156 bgcolor=#E9E9E9
| 283156 ||  || — || January 17, 2009 || Kitt Peak || Spacewatch || — || align=right | 1.7 km || 
|-id=157 bgcolor=#d6d6d6
| 283157 ||  || — || January 17, 2009 || La Sagra || OAM Obs. || BRA || align=right | 2.0 km || 
|-id=158 bgcolor=#E9E9E9
| 283158 ||  || — || January 20, 2009 || Kitt Peak || Spacewatch || AGN || align=right | 1.5 km || 
|-id=159 bgcolor=#d6d6d6
| 283159 ||  || — || January 28, 2009 || Catalina || CSS || EOS || align=right | 3.4 km || 
|-id=160 bgcolor=#d6d6d6
| 283160 ||  || — || January 29, 2009 || Catalina || CSS || EUP || align=right | 4.3 km || 
|-id=161 bgcolor=#d6d6d6
| 283161 ||  || — || January 31, 2009 || Kitt Peak || Spacewatch || — || align=right | 3.3 km || 
|-id=162 bgcolor=#d6d6d6
| 283162 ||  || — || January 18, 2009 || Kitt Peak || Spacewatch || — || align=right | 3.9 km || 
|-id=163 bgcolor=#d6d6d6
| 283163 ||  || — || January 20, 2009 || Mount Lemmon || Mount Lemmon Survey || 3:2 || align=right | 6.4 km || 
|-id=164 bgcolor=#d6d6d6
| 283164 ||  || — || February 1, 2009 || Kitt Peak || Spacewatch || EUP || align=right | 3.8 km || 
|-id=165 bgcolor=#d6d6d6
| 283165 ||  || — || February 3, 2009 || Kitt Peak || Spacewatch || SYL7:4 || align=right | 4.6 km || 
|-id=166 bgcolor=#d6d6d6
| 283166 ||  || — || February 16, 2009 || La Sagra || OAM Obs. || ELF || align=right | 5.0 km || 
|-id=167 bgcolor=#E9E9E9
| 283167 ||  || — || February 22, 2009 || Calar Alto || F. Hormuth || — || align=right | 2.1 km || 
|-id=168 bgcolor=#d6d6d6
| 283168 ||  || — || February 27, 2009 || Kitt Peak || Spacewatch || THB || align=right | 5.7 km || 
|-id=169 bgcolor=#fefefe
| 283169 ||  || — || February 19, 2009 || Socorro || LINEAR || H || align=right data-sort-value="0.65" | 650 m || 
|-id=170 bgcolor=#d6d6d6
| 283170 ||  || — || March 15, 2009 || La Sagra || OAM Obs. || — || align=right | 2.4 km || 
|-id=171 bgcolor=#E9E9E9
| 283171 ||  || — || March 16, 2009 || Kitt Peak || Spacewatch || AGN || align=right | 1.8 km || 
|-id=172 bgcolor=#fefefe
| 283172 ||  || — || March 18, 2009 || Kitt Peak || Spacewatch || — || align=right data-sort-value="0.83" | 830 m || 
|-id=173 bgcolor=#C2FFFF
| 283173 ||  || — || April 22, 2009 || Kitt Peak || Spacewatch || L5 || align=right | 13 km || 
|-id=174 bgcolor=#d6d6d6
| 283174 ||  || — || April 29, 2009 || Kitt Peak || Spacewatch || — || align=right | 3.2 km || 
|-id=175 bgcolor=#E9E9E9
| 283175 ||  || — || May 14, 2009 || Kitt Peak || Spacewatch || — || align=right | 3.1 km || 
|-id=176 bgcolor=#C2FFFF
| 283176 ||  || — || August 29, 2009 || La Sagra || OAM Obs. || L4 || align=right | 14 km || 
|-id=177 bgcolor=#E9E9E9
| 283177 ||  || — || March 15, 2007 || Kitt Peak || Spacewatch || — || align=right | 1.5 km || 
|-id=178 bgcolor=#C2FFFF
| 283178 ||  || — || September 17, 2009 || Mount Lemmon || Mount Lemmon Survey || L5 || align=right | 9.8 km || 
|-id=179 bgcolor=#d6d6d6
| 283179 ||  || — || September 16, 2009 || Kitt Peak || Spacewatch || — || align=right | 3.7 km || 
|-id=180 bgcolor=#E9E9E9
| 283180 ||  || — || September 20, 2009 || Kitt Peak || Spacewatch || — || align=right | 2.4 km || 
|-id=181 bgcolor=#fefefe
| 283181 ||  || — || October 17, 2009 || Socorro || LINEAR || H || align=right | 1.0 km || 
|-id=182 bgcolor=#E9E9E9
| 283182 ||  || — || October 22, 2009 || Catalina || CSS || — || align=right | 2.4 km || 
|-id=183 bgcolor=#E9E9E9
| 283183 ||  || — || October 21, 2009 || Mount Lemmon || Mount Lemmon Survey || AER || align=right | 1.8 km || 
|-id=184 bgcolor=#fefefe
| 283184 ||  || — || October 10, 2002 || Apache Point || SDSS || FLO || align=right data-sort-value="0.71" | 710 m || 
|-id=185 bgcolor=#E9E9E9
| 283185 ||  || — || January 5, 2010 || Kitt Peak || Spacewatch || — || align=right | 1.2 km || 
|-id=186 bgcolor=#fefefe
| 283186 ||  || — || January 19, 2010 || Dauban || F. Kugel || NYS || align=right data-sort-value="0.77" | 770 m || 
|-id=187 bgcolor=#d6d6d6
| 283187 ||  || — || January 16, 2010 || WISE || WISE || SYL7:4 || align=right | 7.0 km || 
|-id=188 bgcolor=#d6d6d6
| 283188 ||  || — || January 16, 2010 || WISE || WISE || EUP || align=right | 7.6 km || 
|-id=189 bgcolor=#E9E9E9
| 283189 ||  || — || February 6, 2010 || Mount Lemmon || Mount Lemmon Survey || — || align=right | 2.0 km || 
|-id=190 bgcolor=#fefefe
| 283190 ||  || — || February 9, 2010 || Mount Lemmon || Mount Lemmon Survey || MAS || align=right data-sort-value="0.77" | 770 m || 
|-id=191 bgcolor=#fefefe
| 283191 ||  || — || February 13, 2010 || Mount Lemmon || Mount Lemmon Survey || — || align=right data-sort-value="0.93" | 930 m || 
|-id=192 bgcolor=#E9E9E9
| 283192 ||  || — || February 13, 2010 || Calvin-Rehoboth || Calvin–Rehoboth Obs. || HNS || align=right | 1.4 km || 
|-id=193 bgcolor=#fefefe
| 283193 ||  || — || February 14, 2010 || Mount Lemmon || Mount Lemmon Survey || — || align=right | 1.1 km || 
|-id=194 bgcolor=#d6d6d6
| 283194 ||  || — || February 14, 2010 || Mount Lemmon || Mount Lemmon Survey || — || align=right | 3.0 km || 
|-id=195 bgcolor=#E9E9E9
| 283195 ||  || — || February 15, 2010 || Catalina || CSS || HOF || align=right | 2.9 km || 
|-id=196 bgcolor=#d6d6d6
| 283196 ||  || — || February 14, 2010 || Catalina || CSS || — || align=right | 3.9 km || 
|-id=197 bgcolor=#E9E9E9
| 283197 ||  || — || February 13, 2010 || Kitt Peak || Spacewatch || — || align=right | 2.8 km || 
|-id=198 bgcolor=#E9E9E9
| 283198 ||  || — || February 10, 2010 || Kitt Peak || Spacewatch || — || align=right | 2.2 km || 
|-id=199 bgcolor=#d6d6d6
| 283199 ||  || — || February 16, 2010 || WISE || WISE || — || align=right | 5.9 km || 
|-id=200 bgcolor=#E9E9E9
| 283200 ||  || — || February 16, 2010 || Kitt Peak || Spacewatch || MIS || align=right | 2.2 km || 
|}

283201–283300 

|-bgcolor=#d6d6d6
| 283201 ||  || — || February 21, 2010 || WISE || WISE || TIR || align=right | 4.6 km || 
|-id=202 bgcolor=#d6d6d6
| 283202 ||  || — || March 13, 2010 || Jarnac || Jarnac Obs. || — || align=right | 5.9 km || 
|-id=203 bgcolor=#d6d6d6
| 283203 ||  || — || March 17, 2010 || Kitt Peak || Spacewatch || — || align=right | 4.6 km || 
|-id=204 bgcolor=#d6d6d6
| 283204 ||  || — || April 25, 2003 || Kitt Peak || Spacewatch || 3:2 || align=right | 5.3 km || 
|-id=205 bgcolor=#E9E9E9
| 283205 ||  || — || September 19, 2007 || Kitt Peak || Spacewatch || NEM || align=right | 2.3 km || 
|-id=206 bgcolor=#d6d6d6
| 283206 ||  || — || April 7, 2010 || Kitt Peak || Spacewatch || VER || align=right | 4.4 km || 
|-id=207 bgcolor=#d6d6d6
| 283207 ||  || — || April 17, 2010 || Bergisch Gladbac || W. Bickel || — || align=right | 3.6 km || 
|-id=208 bgcolor=#E9E9E9
| 283208 ||  || — || November 19, 2003 || Kitt Peak || Spacewatch || — || align=right | 2.1 km || 
|-id=209 bgcolor=#d6d6d6
| 283209 ||  || — || June 12, 2010 || WISE || WISE || ALA || align=right | 4.8 km || 
|-id=210 bgcolor=#E9E9E9
| 283210 ||  || — || February 27, 2000 || Catalina || CSS || — || align=right | 4.1 km || 
|-id=211 bgcolor=#E9E9E9
| 283211 ||  || — || October 19, 2006 || Catalina || CSS || — || align=right | 2.2 km || 
|-id=212 bgcolor=#fefefe
| 283212 ||  || — || November 5, 2007 || Kitt Peak || Spacewatch || ERI || align=right | 2.5 km || 
|-id=213 bgcolor=#E9E9E9
| 283213 ||  || — || July 10, 2010 || WISE || WISE || — || align=right | 2.4 km || 
|-id=214 bgcolor=#E9E9E9
| 283214 ||  || — || March 2, 2009 || Mount Lemmon || Mount Lemmon Survey || ADE || align=right | 2.0 km || 
|-id=215 bgcolor=#d6d6d6
| 283215 ||  || — || July 22, 2010 || WISE || WISE || EUP || align=right | 4.0 km || 
|-id=216 bgcolor=#d6d6d6
| 283216 ||  || — || October 4, 1999 || Catalina || CSS || — || align=right | 4.4 km || 
|-id=217 bgcolor=#d6d6d6
| 283217 ||  || — || July 25, 2010 || WISE || WISE || — || align=right | 3.8 km || 
|-id=218 bgcolor=#E9E9E9
| 283218 ||  || — || July 28, 2010 || WISE || WISE || — || align=right | 1.5 km || 
|-id=219 bgcolor=#d6d6d6
| 283219 ||  || — || October 10, 1999 || Kitt Peak || Spacewatch || EUP || align=right | 4.7 km || 
|-id=220 bgcolor=#d6d6d6
| 283220 ||  || — || August 5, 2010 || Socorro || LINEAR || — || align=right | 3.9 km || 
|-id=221 bgcolor=#fefefe
| 283221 ||  || — || August 3, 2010 || La Sagra || OAM Obs. || V || align=right data-sort-value="0.88" | 880 m || 
|-id=222 bgcolor=#d6d6d6
| 283222 ||  || — || October 19, 1999 || Socorro || LINEAR || — || align=right | 4.0 km || 
|-id=223 bgcolor=#d6d6d6
| 283223 ||  || — || August 13, 2010 || Kitt Peak || Spacewatch || EOS || align=right | 2.6 km || 
|-id=224 bgcolor=#E9E9E9
| 283224 ||  || — || December 18, 2007 || Mount Lemmon || Mount Lemmon Survey || — || align=right | 2.8 km || 
|-id=225 bgcolor=#fefefe
| 283225 ||  || — || August 19, 2010 || Purple Mountain || PMO NEO || NYS || align=right data-sort-value="0.92" | 920 m || 
|-id=226 bgcolor=#d6d6d6
| 283226 ||  || — || August 29, 2005 || Kitt Peak || Spacewatch || — || align=right | 2.2 km || 
|-id=227 bgcolor=#fefefe
| 283227 ||  || — || September 17, 2003 || Kitt Peak || Spacewatch || — || align=right data-sort-value="0.96" | 960 m || 
|-id=228 bgcolor=#fefefe
| 283228 ||  || — || September 3, 2010 || Mount Lemmon || Mount Lemmon Survey || — || align=right | 1.7 km || 
|-id=229 bgcolor=#E9E9E9
| 283229 ||  || — || October 31, 2002 || Apache Point || SDSS || — || align=right | 2.1 km || 
|-id=230 bgcolor=#d6d6d6
| 283230 ||  || — || September 11, 2010 || Kitt Peak || Spacewatch || — || align=right | 4.3 km || 
|-id=231 bgcolor=#E9E9E9
| 283231 ||  || — || September 19, 2006 || Kitt Peak || Spacewatch || — || align=right | 1.6 km || 
|-id=232 bgcolor=#fefefe
| 283232 ||  || — || September 4, 2010 || Kitt Peak || Spacewatch || — || align=right | 1.0 km || 
|-id=233 bgcolor=#d6d6d6
| 283233 ||  || — || October 26, 2005 || Kitt Peak || Spacewatch || — || align=right | 3.9 km || 
|-id=234 bgcolor=#fefefe
| 283234 ||  || — || April 6, 1995 || Kitt Peak || Spacewatch || — || align=right data-sort-value="0.88" | 880 m || 
|-id=235 bgcolor=#E9E9E9
| 283235 ||  || — || March 5, 2008 || Kitt Peak || Spacewatch || — || align=right | 1.5 km || 
|-id=236 bgcolor=#C2FFFF
| 283236 ||  || — || October 11, 2010 || Saint-Sulpice || B. Christophe || L4 || align=right | 12 km || 
|-id=237 bgcolor=#E9E9E9
| 283237 ||  || — || October 17, 2010 || Mount Lemmon || Mount Lemmon Survey || — || align=right | 1.9 km || 
|-id=238 bgcolor=#fefefe
| 283238 ||  || — || September 5, 1999 || Anderson Mesa || LONEOS || — || align=right data-sort-value="0.98" | 980 m || 
|-id=239 bgcolor=#E9E9E9
| 283239 ||  || — || November 24, 2006 || Kitt Peak || Spacewatch || — || align=right | 1.8 km || 
|-id=240 bgcolor=#E9E9E9
| 283240 ||  || — || November 11, 2006 || Kitt Peak || Spacewatch || — || align=right | 1.1 km || 
|-id=241 bgcolor=#E9E9E9
| 283241 ||  || — || November 10, 2006 || Kitt Peak || Spacewatch || RAF || align=right | 1.3 km || 
|-id=242 bgcolor=#fefefe
| 283242 ||  || — || September 15, 2006 || Kitt Peak || Spacewatch || — || align=right data-sort-value="0.80" | 800 m || 
|-id=243 bgcolor=#d6d6d6
| 283243 ||  || — || January 17, 2005 || Kitt Peak || Spacewatch || — || align=right | 4.1 km || 
|-id=244 bgcolor=#E9E9E9
| 283244 ||  || — || December 30, 2005 || Catalina || CSS || — || align=right | 3.1 km || 
|-id=245 bgcolor=#E9E9E9
| 283245 ||  || — || October 5, 2004 || Kitt Peak || Spacewatch || — || align=right | 3.1 km || 
|-id=246 bgcolor=#d6d6d6
| 283246 ||  || — || September 14, 1998 || Kitt Peak || Spacewatch || — || align=right | 3.3 km || 
|-id=247 bgcolor=#E9E9E9
| 283247 ||  || — || December 1, 2005 || Catalina || CSS || — || align=right | 2.4 km || 
|-id=248 bgcolor=#d6d6d6
| 283248 ||  || — || November 19, 2003 || Kitt Peak || Spacewatch || EOS || align=right | 2.8 km || 
|-id=249 bgcolor=#d6d6d6
| 283249 ||  || — || January 28, 2004 || Kitt Peak || Spacewatch || 7:4 || align=right | 4.7 km || 
|-id=250 bgcolor=#d6d6d6
| 283250 ||  || — || February 24, 1995 || Kitt Peak || Spacewatch || EOS || align=right | 2.6 km || 
|-id=251 bgcolor=#d6d6d6
| 283251 ||  || — || March 10, 2005 || Anderson Mesa || LONEOS || 7:4 || align=right | 5.4 km || 
|-id=252 bgcolor=#fefefe
| 283252 ||  || — || February 21, 2003 || Palomar || NEAT || V || align=right | 1.1 km || 
|-id=253 bgcolor=#d6d6d6
| 283253 ||  || — || September 3, 2008 || Kitt Peak || Spacewatch || — || align=right | 4.4 km || 
|-id=254 bgcolor=#d6d6d6
| 283254 ||  || — || November 18, 2003 || Kitt Peak || Spacewatch || EOS || align=right | 2.3 km || 
|-id=255 bgcolor=#d6d6d6
| 283255 ||  || — || April 2, 2006 || Kitt Peak || Spacewatch || — || align=right | 3.8 km || 
|-id=256 bgcolor=#fefefe
| 283256 ||  || — || September 28, 2006 || Mount Lemmon || Mount Lemmon Survey || — || align=right | 1.0 km || 
|-id=257 bgcolor=#d6d6d6
| 283257 ||  || — || April 4, 2005 || Catalina || CSS || — || align=right | 4.5 km || 
|-id=258 bgcolor=#fefefe
| 283258 ||  || — || July 30, 2005 || Palomar || NEAT || FLO || align=right data-sort-value="0.87" | 870 m || 
|-id=259 bgcolor=#fefefe
| 283259 ||  || — || January 27, 2007 || Mount Lemmon || Mount Lemmon Survey || — || align=right data-sort-value="0.99" | 990 m || 
|-id=260 bgcolor=#fefefe
| 283260 ||  || — || September 25, 2005 || Kitt Peak || Spacewatch || — || align=right data-sort-value="0.99" | 990 m || 
|-id=261 bgcolor=#d6d6d6
| 283261 ||  || — || September 12, 2007 || Mount Lemmon || Mount Lemmon Survey || HYG || align=right | 3.8 km || 
|-id=262 bgcolor=#d6d6d6
| 283262 ||  || — || February 2, 1981 || Siding Spring || S. J. Bus || — || align=right | 3.9 km || 
|-id=263 bgcolor=#fefefe
| 283263 ||  || — || November 3, 2005 || Mount Lemmon || Mount Lemmon Survey || — || align=right | 5.1 km || 
|-id=264 bgcolor=#d6d6d6
| 283264 ||  || — || April 7, 2006 || Siding Spring || SSS || — || align=right | 4.6 km || 
|-id=265 bgcolor=#d6d6d6
| 283265 ||  || — || August 6, 2007 || Lulin Observatory || LUSS || — || align=right | 4.1 km || 
|-id=266 bgcolor=#d6d6d6
| 283266 ||  || — || October 15, 2007 || Mount Lemmon || Mount Lemmon Survey || — || align=right | 4.4 km || 
|-id=267 bgcolor=#fefefe
| 283267 ||  || — || September 24, 2005 || Kitt Peak || Spacewatch || V || align=right data-sort-value="0.93" | 930 m || 
|-id=268 bgcolor=#d6d6d6
| 283268 ||  || — || September 12, 2007 || Mount Lemmon || Mount Lemmon Survey || IMH || align=right | 6.2 km || 
|-id=269 bgcolor=#E9E9E9
| 283269 ||  || — || January 2, 2006 || Mount Lemmon || Mount Lemmon Survey || — || align=right | 1.5 km || 
|-id=270 bgcolor=#E9E9E9
| 283270 ||  || — || July 7, 2007 || Reedy Creek || J. Broughton || — || align=right | 2.4 km || 
|-id=271 bgcolor=#fefefe
| 283271 ||  || — || December 18, 2009 || Mount Lemmon || Mount Lemmon Survey || — || align=right | 1.1 km || 
|-id=272 bgcolor=#d6d6d6
| 283272 ||  || — || September 29, 2008 || Mount Lemmon || Mount Lemmon Survey || EOS || align=right | 5.0 km || 
|-id=273 bgcolor=#fefefe
| 283273 ||  || — || October 26, 2005 || Kitt Peak || Spacewatch || V || align=right data-sort-value="0.81" | 810 m || 
|-id=274 bgcolor=#fefefe
| 283274 ||  || — || November 24, 2009 || Kitt Peak || Spacewatch || V || align=right data-sort-value="0.76" | 760 m || 
|-id=275 bgcolor=#E9E9E9
| 283275 ||  || — || July 13, 1993 || La Silla || E. W. Elst || — || align=right | 3.7 km || 
|-id=276 bgcolor=#d6d6d6
| 283276 ||  || — || May 20, 2006 || Kitt Peak || Spacewatch || — || align=right | 2.9 km || 
|-id=277 bgcolor=#fefefe
| 283277 Faber ||  ||  || August 13, 2004 || Cerro Tololo || L. H. Wasserman || NYS || align=right data-sort-value="0.79" | 790 m || 
|-id=278 bgcolor=#E9E9E9
| 283278 ||  || — || May 6, 2002 || Palomar || NEAT || — || align=right | 2.6 km || 
|-id=279 bgcolor=#E9E9E9
| 283279 Qianweichang ||  ||  || May 16, 2007 || XuYi || PMO NEO || — || align=right | 1.5 km || 
|-id=280 bgcolor=#d6d6d6
| 283280 ||  || — || May 9, 2006 || Mount Lemmon || Mount Lemmon Survey || EOS || align=right | 2.8 km || 
|-id=281 bgcolor=#E9E9E9
| 283281 ||  || — || June 5, 2002 || Haleakala || NEAT || — || align=right | 3.8 km || 
|-id=282 bgcolor=#d6d6d6
| 283282 ||  || — || July 21, 2006 || Mount Lemmon || Mount Lemmon Survey || — || align=right | 3.6 km || 
|-id=283 bgcolor=#d6d6d6
| 283283 ||  || — || March 8, 2005 || Mount Lemmon || Mount Lemmon Survey || — || align=right | 4.4 km || 
|-id=284 bgcolor=#d6d6d6
| 283284 ||  || — || March 2, 2005 || Catalina || CSS || EOS || align=right | 3.0 km || 
|-id=285 bgcolor=#fefefe
| 283285 ||  || — || April 1, 2003 || Apache Point || SDSS || — || align=right | 1.1 km || 
|-id=286 bgcolor=#E9E9E9
| 283286 ||  || — || March 4, 2006 || Catalina || CSS || — || align=right | 3.2 km || 
|-id=287 bgcolor=#E9E9E9
| 283287 ||  || — || June 14, 2002 || Socorro || LINEAR || — || align=right | 2.7 km || 
|-id=288 bgcolor=#d6d6d6
| 283288 ||  || — || October 22, 2001 || Palomar || NEAT || — || align=right | 4.6 km || 
|-id=289 bgcolor=#d6d6d6
| 283289 ||  || — || October 10, 2007 || Catalina || CSS || — || align=right | 3.9 km || 
|-id=290 bgcolor=#d6d6d6
| 283290 ||  || — || May 28, 2000 || Socorro || LINEAR || — || align=right | 4.2 km || 
|-id=291 bgcolor=#fefefe
| 283291 ||  || — || June 30, 2008 || Kitt Peak || Spacewatch || — || align=right data-sort-value="0.94" | 940 m || 
|-id=292 bgcolor=#d6d6d6
| 283292 ||  || — || January 8, 1994 || Kitt Peak || Spacewatch || — || align=right | 3.5 km || 
|-id=293 bgcolor=#d6d6d6
| 283293 ||  || — || September 19, 2007 || Kitt Peak || Spacewatch || — || align=right | 5.0 km || 
|-id=294 bgcolor=#fefefe
| 283294 ||  || — || April 5, 2000 || Socorro || LINEAR || NYS || align=right data-sort-value="0.70" | 700 m || 
|-id=295 bgcolor=#E9E9E9
| 283295 ||  || — || April 22, 2007 || Mount Lemmon || Mount Lemmon Survey || — || align=right | 1.0 km || 
|-id=296 bgcolor=#d6d6d6
| 283296 ||  || — || August 17, 2001 || Palomar || NEAT || ALA || align=right | 4.3 km || 
|-id=297 bgcolor=#fefefe
| 283297 ||  || — || December 21, 2006 || Kitt Peak || Spacewatch || — || align=right data-sort-value="0.77" | 770 m || 
|-id=298 bgcolor=#fefefe
| 283298 ||  || — || July 12, 2001 || Palomar || NEAT || FLO || align=right data-sort-value="0.72" | 720 m || 
|-id=299 bgcolor=#E9E9E9
| 283299 ||  || — || December 19, 2001 || Palomar || NEAT || — || align=right | 1.4 km || 
|-id=300 bgcolor=#E9E9E9
| 283300 ||  || — || July 4, 2003 || Kitt Peak || Spacewatch || EUN || align=right | 1.7 km || 
|}

283301–283400 

|-bgcolor=#fefefe
| 283301 ||  || — || March 3, 2000 || Apache Point || SDSS || NYS || align=right data-sort-value="0.73" | 730 m || 
|-id=302 bgcolor=#d6d6d6
| 283302 ||  || — || February 1, 2005 || Kitt Peak || Spacewatch || — || align=right | 2.7 km || 
|-id=303 bgcolor=#fefefe
| 283303 ||  || — || June 11, 2004 || Palomar || NEAT || — || align=right data-sort-value="0.78" | 780 m || 
|-id=304 bgcolor=#fefefe
| 283304 ||  || — || February 17, 2007 || Kitt Peak || Spacewatch || — || align=right data-sort-value="0.83" | 830 m || 
|-id=305 bgcolor=#E9E9E9
| 283305 ||  || — || March 12, 2002 || Palomar || NEAT || RAF || align=right | 1.1 km || 
|-id=306 bgcolor=#d6d6d6
| 283306 ||  || — || February 12, 2000 || Apache Point || SDSS || — || align=right | 2.9 km || 
|-id=307 bgcolor=#E9E9E9
| 283307 ||  || — || April 2, 2006 || Kitt Peak || Spacewatch || HEN || align=right | 1.3 km || 
|-id=308 bgcolor=#d6d6d6
| 283308 ||  || — || November 6, 2008 || Kitt Peak || Spacewatch || — || align=right | 4.8 km || 
|-id=309 bgcolor=#fefefe
| 283309 ||  || — || March 26, 2004 || Kitt Peak || Spacewatch || FLO || align=right data-sort-value="0.62" | 620 m || 
|-id=310 bgcolor=#d6d6d6
| 283310 ||  || — || November 30, 2003 || Kitt Peak || Spacewatch || KOR || align=right | 1.5 km || 
|-id=311 bgcolor=#fefefe
| 283311 ||  || — || April 15, 2007 || Kitt Peak || Spacewatch || SUL || align=right | 2.6 km || 
|-id=312 bgcolor=#fefefe
| 283312 ||  || — || November 3, 2005 || Mount Lemmon || Mount Lemmon Survey || V || align=right data-sort-value="0.85" | 850 m || 
|-id=313 bgcolor=#fefefe
| 283313 ||  || — || November 30, 2005 || Socorro || LINEAR || FLO || align=right data-sort-value="0.81" | 810 m || 
|-id=314 bgcolor=#E9E9E9
| 283314 ||  || — || March 5, 2006 || Kitt Peak || Spacewatch || MRX || align=right | 1.3 km || 
|-id=315 bgcolor=#d6d6d6
| 283315 ||  || — || September 30, 1997 || Kitt Peak || Spacewatch || — || align=right | 2.9 km || 
|-id=316 bgcolor=#d6d6d6
| 283316 || 1029 T-3 || — || October 17, 1977 || Palomar || PLS || — || align=right | 3.3 km || 
|-id=317 bgcolor=#d6d6d6
| 283317 ||  || — || October 16, 1977 || Palomar || PLS || — || align=right | 2.8 km || 
|-id=318 bgcolor=#d6d6d6
| 283318 ||  || — || February 26, 1992 || Kitt Peak || Spacewatch || HIL3:2 || align=right | 8.1 km || 
|-id=319 bgcolor=#FA8072
| 283319 ||  || — || November 19, 1992 || Palomar || E. F. Helin || — || align=right data-sort-value="0.78" | 780 m || 
|-id=320 bgcolor=#fefefe
| 283320 ||  || — || September 29, 1994 || Kitt Peak || Spacewatch || — || align=right data-sort-value="0.75" | 750 m || 
|-id=321 bgcolor=#fefefe
| 283321 ||  || — || September 19, 1995 || Kitt Peak || Spacewatch || FLO || align=right data-sort-value="0.80" | 800 m || 
|-id=322 bgcolor=#d6d6d6
| 283322 ||  || — || September 23, 1995 || Kitt Peak || Spacewatch || — || align=right | 3.5 km || 
|-id=323 bgcolor=#E9E9E9
| 283323 ||  || — || January 12, 1996 || Kitt Peak || Spacewatch || HEN || align=right | 1.3 km || 
|-id=324 bgcolor=#d6d6d6
| 283324 ||  || — || November 7, 1996 || Kitt Peak || Spacewatch || — || align=right | 2.2 km || 
|-id=325 bgcolor=#d6d6d6
| 283325 ||  || — || January 10, 1997 || Mauna Kea || C. Veillet || — || align=right | 4.2 km || 
|-id=326 bgcolor=#E9E9E9
| 283326 ||  || — || February 2, 1997 || Kitt Peak || Spacewatch || — || align=right | 1.4 km || 
|-id=327 bgcolor=#E9E9E9
| 283327 ||  || — || May 1, 1997 || Kitt Peak || Spacewatch || PAD || align=right | 2.0 km || 
|-id=328 bgcolor=#E9E9E9
| 283328 ||  || — || May 29, 1997 || Kitt Peak || Spacewatch || AEO || align=right | 1.2 km || 
|-id=329 bgcolor=#fefefe
| 283329 ||  || — || September 11, 1997 || Dynic || A. Sugie || PHO || align=right | 1.1 km || 
|-id=330 bgcolor=#E9E9E9
| 283330 ||  || — || March 26, 1998 || Caussols || ODAS || — || align=right | 1.4 km || 
|-id=331 bgcolor=#E9E9E9
| 283331 ||  || — || April 19, 1998 || Socorro || LINEAR || — || align=right | 1.2 km || 
|-id=332 bgcolor=#E9E9E9
| 283332 ||  || — || June 22, 1998 || Kitt Peak || Spacewatch || — || align=right | 1.1 km || 
|-id=333 bgcolor=#E9E9E9
| 283333 ||  || — || August 23, 1998 || Xinglong || SCAP || ADE || align=right | 2.6 km || 
|-id=334 bgcolor=#E9E9E9
| 283334 ||  || — || November 10, 1998 || Socorro || LINEAR || INO || align=right | 2.0 km || 
|-id=335 bgcolor=#E9E9E9
| 283335 ||  || — || December 8, 1998 || Kitt Peak || Spacewatch || — || align=right | 2.3 km || 
|-id=336 bgcolor=#fefefe
| 283336 ||  || — || February 7, 1999 || Kitt Peak || Spacewatch || — || align=right | 1.1 km || 
|-id=337 bgcolor=#fefefe
| 283337 ||  || — || February 9, 1999 || Kitt Peak || Spacewatch || NYS || align=right data-sort-value="0.70" | 700 m || 
|-id=338 bgcolor=#E9E9E9
| 283338 ||  || — || September 7, 1999 || Socorro || LINEAR || — || align=right | 1.1 km || 
|-id=339 bgcolor=#E9E9E9
| 283339 ||  || — || September 9, 1999 || Socorro || LINEAR || — || align=right | 1.1 km || 
|-id=340 bgcolor=#E9E9E9
| 283340 ||  || — || October 10, 1999 || Socorro || LINEAR || — || align=right | 1.3 km || 
|-id=341 bgcolor=#E9E9E9
| 283341 ||  || — || October 14, 1999 || Socorro || LINEAR || RAF || align=right | 1.2 km || 
|-id=342 bgcolor=#E9E9E9
| 283342 ||  || — || October 9, 1999 || Catalina || CSS || — || align=right | 1.4 km || 
|-id=343 bgcolor=#E9E9E9
| 283343 ||  || — || October 15, 1999 || Kitt Peak || Spacewatch || — || align=right | 1.2 km || 
|-id=344 bgcolor=#E9E9E9
| 283344 ||  || — || October 31, 1999 || Kitt Peak || Spacewatch || RAF || align=right | 1.3 km || 
|-id=345 bgcolor=#FA8072
| 283345 ||  || — || November 2, 1999 || Socorro || LINEAR || H || align=right data-sort-value="0.74" | 740 m || 
|-id=346 bgcolor=#E9E9E9
| 283346 ||  || — || November 3, 1999 || Socorro || LINEAR || — || align=right | 1.5 km || 
|-id=347 bgcolor=#E9E9E9
| 283347 ||  || — || November 3, 1999 || Socorro || LINEAR || — || align=right | 1.4 km || 
|-id=348 bgcolor=#E9E9E9
| 283348 ||  || — || November 3, 1999 || Socorro || LINEAR || — || align=right | 1.6 km || 
|-id=349 bgcolor=#E9E9E9
| 283349 ||  || — || November 4, 1999 || Socorro || LINEAR || — || align=right | 1.3 km || 
|-id=350 bgcolor=#E9E9E9
| 283350 ||  || — || November 4, 1999 || Socorro || LINEAR || — || align=right | 1.1 km || 
|-id=351 bgcolor=#E9E9E9
| 283351 ||  || — || November 4, 1999 || Socorro || LINEAR || — || align=right | 1.3 km || 
|-id=352 bgcolor=#E9E9E9
| 283352 ||  || — || November 4, 1999 || Socorro || LINEAR || ADE || align=right | 2.3 km || 
|-id=353 bgcolor=#E9E9E9
| 283353 ||  || — || November 5, 1999 || Socorro || LINEAR || — || align=right data-sort-value="0.91" | 910 m || 
|-id=354 bgcolor=#E9E9E9
| 283354 ||  || — || December 7, 1999 || Kitt Peak || Spacewatch || — || align=right | 1.4 km || 
|-id=355 bgcolor=#fefefe
| 283355 ||  || — || December 12, 1999 || Socorro || LINEAR || H || align=right | 1.00 km || 
|-id=356 bgcolor=#E9E9E9
| 283356 ||  || — || January 3, 2000 || Socorro || LINEAR || — || align=right | 2.1 km || 
|-id=357 bgcolor=#E9E9E9
| 283357 ||  || — || January 3, 2000 || Socorro || LINEAR || JUN || align=right | 1.6 km || 
|-id=358 bgcolor=#E9E9E9
| 283358 ||  || — || January 5, 2000 || Kitt Peak || Spacewatch || PAD || align=right | 2.1 km || 
|-id=359 bgcolor=#E9E9E9
| 283359 ||  || — || January 5, 2000 || Socorro || LINEAR || — || align=right | 3.8 km || 
|-id=360 bgcolor=#E9E9E9
| 283360 ||  || — || January 4, 2000 || Socorro || LINEAR || — || align=right | 2.8 km || 
|-id=361 bgcolor=#E9E9E9
| 283361 ||  || — || January 7, 2000 || Socorro || LINEAR || — || align=right | 2.2 km || 
|-id=362 bgcolor=#E9E9E9
| 283362 ||  || — || January 7, 2000 || Socorro || LINEAR || CLO || align=right | 3.7 km || 
|-id=363 bgcolor=#E9E9E9
| 283363 ||  || — || January 8, 2000 || Socorro || LINEAR || — || align=right | 3.1 km || 
|-id=364 bgcolor=#E9E9E9
| 283364 ||  || — || January 26, 2000 || Kitt Peak || Spacewatch || AGN || align=right | 1.2 km || 
|-id=365 bgcolor=#E9E9E9
| 283365 ||  || — || January 26, 2000 || Kitt Peak || Spacewatch || — || align=right | 2.0 km || 
|-id=366 bgcolor=#E9E9E9
| 283366 ||  || — || February 1, 2000 || Kitt Peak || Spacewatch || — || align=right | 3.2 km || 
|-id=367 bgcolor=#E9E9E9
| 283367 ||  || — || February 29, 2000 || Socorro || LINEAR || — || align=right | 3.7 km || 
|-id=368 bgcolor=#fefefe
| 283368 ||  || — || February 29, 2000 || Socorro || LINEAR || — || align=right | 1.4 km || 
|-id=369 bgcolor=#FA8072
| 283369 ||  || — || March 3, 2000 || Socorro || LINEAR || — || align=right data-sort-value="0.98" | 980 m || 
|-id=370 bgcolor=#fefefe
| 283370 ||  || — || March 9, 2000 || Socorro || LINEAR || — || align=right | 1.1 km || 
|-id=371 bgcolor=#E9E9E9
| 283371 ||  || — || March 12, 2000 || Kitt Peak || Spacewatch || HOF || align=right | 3.0 km || 
|-id=372 bgcolor=#fefefe
| 283372 ||  || — || March 29, 2000 || Kitt Peak || Spacewatch || — || align=right data-sort-value="0.86" | 860 m || 
|-id=373 bgcolor=#E9E9E9
| 283373 ||  || — || April 3, 2000 || Kitt Peak || Spacewatch || INO || align=right | 1.6 km || 
|-id=374 bgcolor=#fefefe
| 283374 ||  || — || April 29, 2000 || Socorro || LINEAR || H || align=right data-sort-value="0.72" | 720 m || 
|-id=375 bgcolor=#fefefe
| 283375 ||  || — || April 29, 2000 || Anderson Mesa || LONEOS || H || align=right data-sort-value="0.84" | 840 m || 
|-id=376 bgcolor=#fefefe
| 283376 ||  || — || May 24, 2000 || Kitt Peak || Spacewatch || — || align=right data-sort-value="0.73" | 730 m || 
|-id=377 bgcolor=#FA8072
| 283377 ||  || — || August 8, 2000 || Socorro || LINEAR || — || align=right | 1.6 km || 
|-id=378 bgcolor=#d6d6d6
| 283378 ||  || — || August 23, 2000 || Socorro || LINEAR || Tj (2.97) || align=right | 4.2 km || 
|-id=379 bgcolor=#fefefe
| 283379 ||  || — || August 24, 2000 || Socorro || LINEAR || — || align=right data-sort-value="0.94" | 940 m || 
|-id=380 bgcolor=#fefefe
| 283380 ||  || — || August 24, 2000 || Socorro || LINEAR || — || align=right | 1.4 km || 
|-id=381 bgcolor=#fefefe
| 283381 ||  || — || August 25, 2000 || Socorro || LINEAR || PHO || align=right | 1.2 km || 
|-id=382 bgcolor=#fefefe
| 283382 ||  || — || August 25, 2000 || Socorro || LINEAR || MAS || align=right data-sort-value="0.94" | 940 m || 
|-id=383 bgcolor=#fefefe
| 283383 ||  || — || August 24, 2000 || Socorro || LINEAR || — || align=right data-sort-value="0.82" | 820 m || 
|-id=384 bgcolor=#fefefe
| 283384 ||  || — || August 24, 2000 || Socorro || LINEAR || — || align=right data-sort-value="0.99" | 990 m || 
|-id=385 bgcolor=#fefefe
| 283385 ||  || — || August 24, 2000 || Socorro || LINEAR || — || align=right | 1.2 km || 
|-id=386 bgcolor=#fefefe
| 283386 ||  || — || August 24, 2000 || Socorro || LINEAR || NYS || align=right data-sort-value="0.84" | 840 m || 
|-id=387 bgcolor=#fefefe
| 283387 ||  || — || August 31, 2000 || Socorro || LINEAR || — || align=right | 1.1 km || 
|-id=388 bgcolor=#fefefe
| 283388 ||  || — || August 29, 2000 || Socorro || LINEAR || NYS || align=right data-sort-value="0.96" | 960 m || 
|-id=389 bgcolor=#FA8072
| 283389 ||  || — || August 29, 2000 || Socorro || LINEAR || — || align=right | 1.2 km || 
|-id=390 bgcolor=#d6d6d6
| 283390 ||  || — || August 31, 2000 || Socorro || LINEAR || TIR || align=right | 4.2 km || 
|-id=391 bgcolor=#fefefe
| 283391 ||  || — || September 1, 2000 || Socorro || LINEAR || — || align=right | 1.7 km || 
|-id=392 bgcolor=#fefefe
| 283392 ||  || — || September 1, 2000 || Socorro || LINEAR || H || align=right | 1.3 km || 
|-id=393 bgcolor=#FA8072
| 283393 ||  || — || September 5, 2000 || Socorro || LINEAR || — || align=right | 1.5 km || 
|-id=394 bgcolor=#d6d6d6
| 283394 ||  || — || September 1, 2000 || Socorro || LINEAR || TIR || align=right | 4.1 km || 
|-id=395 bgcolor=#fefefe
| 283395 ||  || — || September 4, 2000 || Kitt Peak || Spacewatch || — || align=right | 1.3 km || 
|-id=396 bgcolor=#C2FFFF
| 283396 ||  || — || September 5, 2000 || Anderson Mesa || LONEOS || L5 || align=right | 17 km || 
|-id=397 bgcolor=#d6d6d6
| 283397 ||  || — || September 5, 2000 || Anderson Mesa || LONEOS || Tj (2.96) || align=right | 6.3 km || 
|-id=398 bgcolor=#fefefe
| 283398 ||  || — || September 5, 2000 || Anderson Mesa || LONEOS || — || align=right | 1.6 km || 
|-id=399 bgcolor=#E9E9E9
| 283399 ||  || — || September 22, 2000 || Socorro || LINEAR || — || align=right | 3.3 km || 
|-id=400 bgcolor=#fefefe
| 283400 ||  || — || September 23, 2000 || Socorro || LINEAR || — || align=right | 1.4 km || 
|}

283401–283500 

|-bgcolor=#C2FFFF
| 283401 ||  || — || September 23, 2000 || Socorro || LINEAR || L5slow || align=right | 17 km || 
|-id=402 bgcolor=#C2FFFF
| 283402 ||  || — || September 23, 2000 || Socorro || LINEAR || L5 || align=right | 17 km || 
|-id=403 bgcolor=#fefefe
| 283403 ||  || — || September 23, 2000 || Socorro || LINEAR || — || align=right | 1.1 km || 
|-id=404 bgcolor=#fefefe
| 283404 ||  || — || September 23, 2000 || Socorro || LINEAR || — || align=right | 1.5 km || 
|-id=405 bgcolor=#d6d6d6
| 283405 ||  || — || September 23, 2000 || Socorro || LINEAR || — || align=right | 5.8 km || 
|-id=406 bgcolor=#fefefe
| 283406 ||  || — || September 24, 2000 || Socorro || LINEAR || NYS || align=right | 1.1 km || 
|-id=407 bgcolor=#fefefe
| 283407 ||  || — || September 24, 2000 || Socorro || LINEAR || — || align=right | 1.2 km || 
|-id=408 bgcolor=#fefefe
| 283408 ||  || — || September 24, 2000 || Socorro || LINEAR || V || align=right data-sort-value="0.96" | 960 m || 
|-id=409 bgcolor=#fefefe
| 283409 ||  || — || September 24, 2000 || Socorro || LINEAR || — || align=right | 1.2 km || 
|-id=410 bgcolor=#fefefe
| 283410 ||  || — || September 23, 2000 || Socorro || LINEAR || NYS || align=right | 1.0 km || 
|-id=411 bgcolor=#fefefe
| 283411 ||  || — || September 24, 2000 || Socorro || LINEAR || MAS || align=right data-sort-value="0.96" | 960 m || 
|-id=412 bgcolor=#fefefe
| 283412 ||  || — || September 24, 2000 || Socorro || LINEAR || NYS || align=right | 1.2 km || 
|-id=413 bgcolor=#d6d6d6
| 283413 ||  || — || September 22, 2000 || Socorro || LINEAR || TIR || align=right | 3.9 km || 
|-id=414 bgcolor=#d6d6d6
| 283414 ||  || — || September 23, 2000 || Socorro || LINEAR || — || align=right | 5.6 km || 
|-id=415 bgcolor=#fefefe
| 283415 ||  || — || September 24, 2000 || Socorro || LINEAR || — || align=right | 1.3 km || 
|-id=416 bgcolor=#fefefe
| 283416 ||  || — || September 24, 2000 || Socorro || LINEAR || — || align=right | 1.0 km || 
|-id=417 bgcolor=#d6d6d6
| 283417 ||  || — || September 28, 2000 || Socorro || LINEAR || EUP || align=right | 6.3 km || 
|-id=418 bgcolor=#d6d6d6
| 283418 ||  || — || September 24, 2000 || Socorro || LINEAR || VER || align=right | 3.9 km || 
|-id=419 bgcolor=#C2FFFF
| 283419 ||  || — || September 24, 2000 || Socorro || LINEAR || L5 || align=right | 13 km || 
|-id=420 bgcolor=#fefefe
| 283420 ||  || — || September 28, 2000 || Socorro || LINEAR || MAS || align=right | 1.1 km || 
|-id=421 bgcolor=#fefefe
| 283421 ||  || — || September 24, 2000 || Socorro || LINEAR || V || align=right data-sort-value="0.97" | 970 m || 
|-id=422 bgcolor=#d6d6d6
| 283422 ||  || — || September 30, 2000 || Socorro || LINEAR || — || align=right | 3.2 km || 
|-id=423 bgcolor=#d6d6d6
| 283423 ||  || — || September 24, 2000 || Socorro || LINEAR || — || align=right | 4.6 km || 
|-id=424 bgcolor=#C2FFFF
| 283424 ||  || — || September 30, 2000 || Socorro || LINEAR || L5 || align=right | 16 km || 
|-id=425 bgcolor=#d6d6d6
| 283425 ||  || — || September 28, 2000 || Socorro || LINEAR || — || align=right | 4.3 km || 
|-id=426 bgcolor=#fefefe
| 283426 ||  || — || September 28, 2000 || Kitt Peak || Spacewatch || MAS || align=right data-sort-value="0.92" | 920 m || 
|-id=427 bgcolor=#fefefe
| 283427 ||  || — || September 21, 2000 || Anderson Mesa || LONEOS || H || align=right data-sort-value="0.81" | 810 m || 
|-id=428 bgcolor=#fefefe
| 283428 ||  || — || October 1, 2000 || Socorro || LINEAR || — || align=right data-sort-value="0.82" | 820 m || 
|-id=429 bgcolor=#fefefe
| 283429 ||  || — || October 4, 2000 || Socorro || LINEAR || — || align=right | 3.7 km || 
|-id=430 bgcolor=#fefefe
| 283430 ||  || — || October 4, 2000 || Socorro || LINEAR || — || align=right | 1.9 km || 
|-id=431 bgcolor=#fefefe
| 283431 ||  || — || October 1, 2000 || Anderson Mesa || LONEOS || — || align=right | 1.2 km || 
|-id=432 bgcolor=#d6d6d6
| 283432 ||  || — || October 1, 2000 || Anderson Mesa || LONEOS || EOS || align=right | 2.8 km || 
|-id=433 bgcolor=#E9E9E9
| 283433 ||  || — || October 25, 2000 || Socorro || LINEAR || — || align=right | 3.9 km || 
|-id=434 bgcolor=#fefefe
| 283434 ||  || — || October 25, 2000 || Socorro || LINEAR || — || align=right | 1.4 km || 
|-id=435 bgcolor=#fefefe
| 283435 ||  || — || October 31, 2000 || Socorro || LINEAR || — || align=right | 3.0 km || 
|-id=436 bgcolor=#fefefe
| 283436 ||  || — || October 29, 2000 || Socorro || LINEAR || — || align=right | 1.4 km || 
|-id=437 bgcolor=#fefefe
| 283437 ||  || — || October 30, 2000 || Socorro || LINEAR || — || align=right | 1.1 km || 
|-id=438 bgcolor=#FA8072
| 283438 ||  || — || November 3, 2000 || Socorro || LINEAR || — || align=right | 1.4 km || 
|-id=439 bgcolor=#fefefe
| 283439 ||  || — || November 23, 2000 || Bisei SG Center || BATTeRS || NYS || align=right | 1.2 km || 
|-id=440 bgcolor=#fefefe
| 283440 ||  || — || November 23, 2000 || Kitt Peak || Spacewatch || NYS || align=right | 1.0 km || 
|-id=441 bgcolor=#fefefe
| 283441 ||  || — || November 19, 2000 || Socorro || LINEAR || — || align=right | 1.6 km || 
|-id=442 bgcolor=#E9E9E9
| 283442 ||  || — || November 20, 2000 || Socorro || LINEAR || — || align=right | 1.6 km || 
|-id=443 bgcolor=#E9E9E9
| 283443 ||  || — || November 28, 2000 || Kitt Peak || Spacewatch || — || align=right | 1.4 km || 
|-id=444 bgcolor=#E9E9E9
| 283444 ||  || — || November 20, 2000 || Socorro || LINEAR || — || align=right | 2.1 km || 
|-id=445 bgcolor=#d6d6d6
| 283445 ||  || — || November 21, 2000 || Socorro || LINEAR || — || align=right | 3.3 km || 
|-id=446 bgcolor=#fefefe
| 283446 ||  || — || November 25, 2000 || Socorro || LINEAR || — || align=right | 1.6 km || 
|-id=447 bgcolor=#fefefe
| 283447 ||  || — || November 18, 2000 || Anderson Mesa || LONEOS || — || align=right | 1.7 km || 
|-id=448 bgcolor=#d6d6d6
| 283448 ||  || — || December 19, 2000 || Haleakala || NEAT || EUP || align=right | 6.3 km || 
|-id=449 bgcolor=#E9E9E9
| 283449 ||  || — || December 30, 2000 || Kitt Peak || Spacewatch || — || align=right | 1.3 km || 
|-id=450 bgcolor=#FA8072
| 283450 ||  || — || January 2, 2001 || Anderson Mesa || LONEOS || — || align=right | 2.6 km || 
|-id=451 bgcolor=#E9E9E9
| 283451 ||  || — || February 16, 2001 || Kitt Peak || Spacewatch || — || align=right | 2.1 km || 
|-id=452 bgcolor=#E9E9E9
| 283452 ||  || — || March 19, 2001 || Kitt Peak || Spacewatch || — || align=right | 2.0 km || 
|-id=453 bgcolor=#E9E9E9
| 283453 ||  || — || March 18, 2001 || Anderson Mesa || LONEOS || — || align=right | 2.4 km || 
|-id=454 bgcolor=#E9E9E9
| 283454 ||  || — || March 28, 2001 || Kitt Peak || Spacewatch || GEF || align=right | 1.9 km || 
|-id=455 bgcolor=#E9E9E9
| 283455 Philipkrider ||  ||  || March 22, 2001 || Kitt Peak || SKADS || — || align=right | 2.3 km || 
|-id=456 bgcolor=#E9E9E9
| 283456 ||  || — || April 17, 2001 || Anderson Mesa || LONEOS || GEF || align=right | 2.1 km || 
|-id=457 bgcolor=#FFC2E0
| 283457 ||  || — || June 19, 2001 || Palomar || NEAT || AMO || align=right data-sort-value="0.56" | 560 m || 
|-id=458 bgcolor=#fefefe
| 283458 ||  || — || July 13, 2001 || Palomar || NEAT || FLO || align=right data-sort-value="0.61" | 610 m || 
|-id=459 bgcolor=#fefefe
| 283459 ||  || — || July 26, 2001 || Palomar || NEAT || — || align=right | 1.1 km || 
|-id=460 bgcolor=#FFC2E0
| 283460 ||  || — || August 4, 2001 || Haleakala || NEAT || AMO || align=right data-sort-value="0.72" | 720 m || 
|-id=461 bgcolor=#FA8072
| 283461 Leacipaola ||  ||  || August 14, 2001 || San Marcello || L. Tesi || — || align=right data-sort-value="0.78" | 780 m || 
|-id=462 bgcolor=#fefefe
| 283462 ||  || — || August 13, 2001 || Haleakala || NEAT || — || align=right data-sort-value="0.98" | 980 m || 
|-id=463 bgcolor=#fefefe
| 283463 ||  || — || August 16, 2001 || Socorro || LINEAR || — || align=right data-sort-value="0.84" | 840 m || 
|-id=464 bgcolor=#fefefe
| 283464 ||  || — || August 21, 2001 || Kitt Peak || Spacewatch || — || align=right data-sort-value="0.87" | 870 m || 
|-id=465 bgcolor=#d6d6d6
| 283465 ||  || — || August 23, 2001 || Socorro || LINEAR || — || align=right | 6.2 km || 
|-id=466 bgcolor=#fefefe
| 283466 ||  || — || August 17, 2001 || Socorro || LINEAR || V || align=right | 2.5 km || 
|-id=467 bgcolor=#fefefe
| 283467 ||  || — || August 19, 2001 || Socorro || LINEAR || FLO || align=right data-sort-value="0.80" | 800 m || 
|-id=468 bgcolor=#d6d6d6
| 283468 ||  || — || August 24, 2001 || Kitt Peak || Spacewatch || — || align=right | 3.1 km || 
|-id=469 bgcolor=#fefefe
| 283469 ||  || — || August 23, 2001 || Socorro || LINEAR || PHO || align=right | 1.3 km || 
|-id=470 bgcolor=#FA8072
| 283470 ||  || — || August 26, 2001 || Socorro || LINEAR || — || align=right | 1.5 km || 
|-id=471 bgcolor=#fefefe
| 283471 ||  || — || August 25, 2001 || Socorro || LINEAR || — || align=right data-sort-value="0.93" | 930 m || 
|-id=472 bgcolor=#fefefe
| 283472 ||  || — || August 23, 2001 || Anderson Mesa || LONEOS || FLO || align=right data-sort-value="0.66" | 660 m || 
|-id=473 bgcolor=#fefefe
| 283473 ||  || — || August 24, 2001 || Socorro || LINEAR || — || align=right data-sort-value="0.72" | 720 m || 
|-id=474 bgcolor=#d6d6d6
| 283474 ||  || — || August 25, 2001 || Socorro || LINEAR || EOS || align=right | 2.6 km || 
|-id=475 bgcolor=#fefefe
| 283475 ||  || — || August 16, 2001 || Socorro || LINEAR || V || align=right data-sort-value="0.89" | 890 m || 
|-id=476 bgcolor=#fefefe
| 283476 ||  || — || August 24, 2001 || Anderson Mesa || LONEOS || FLO || align=right data-sort-value="0.69" | 690 m || 
|-id=477 bgcolor=#d6d6d6
| 283477 ||  || — || August 19, 2001 || Cerro Tololo || M. W. Buie || — || align=right | 4.4 km || 
|-id=478 bgcolor=#E9E9E9
| 283478 ||  || — || August 17, 2001 || Palomar || NEAT || — || align=right | 1.5 km || 
|-id=479 bgcolor=#d6d6d6
| 283479 ||  || — || September 11, 2001 || Socorro || LINEAR || — || align=right | 3.5 km || 
|-id=480 bgcolor=#d6d6d6
| 283480 ||  || — || September 10, 2001 || Socorro || LINEAR || — || align=right | 4.1 km || 
|-id=481 bgcolor=#fefefe
| 283481 ||  || — || September 12, 2001 || Kitt Peak || Spacewatch || — || align=right data-sort-value="0.70" | 700 m || 
|-id=482 bgcolor=#fefefe
| 283482 ||  || — || September 12, 2001 || Socorro || LINEAR || — || align=right data-sort-value="0.78" | 780 m || 
|-id=483 bgcolor=#fefefe
| 283483 ||  || — || September 12, 2001 || Socorro || LINEAR || — || align=right | 1.1 km || 
|-id=484 bgcolor=#d6d6d6
| 283484 ||  || — || September 18, 2001 || Kitt Peak || Spacewatch || — || align=right | 3.2 km || 
|-id=485 bgcolor=#d6d6d6
| 283485 ||  || — || September 16, 2001 || Socorro || LINEAR || — || align=right | 3.1 km || 
|-id=486 bgcolor=#fefefe
| 283486 ||  || — || September 16, 2001 || Socorro || LINEAR || FLO || align=right | 1.1 km || 
|-id=487 bgcolor=#fefefe
| 283487 ||  || — || September 16, 2001 || Socorro || LINEAR || — || align=right data-sort-value="0.83" | 830 m || 
|-id=488 bgcolor=#fefefe
| 283488 ||  || — || September 20, 2001 || Socorro || LINEAR || — || align=right data-sort-value="0.92" | 920 m || 
|-id=489 bgcolor=#fefefe
| 283489 ||  || — || September 20, 2001 || Socorro || LINEAR || FLO || align=right data-sort-value="0.60" | 600 m || 
|-id=490 bgcolor=#fefefe
| 283490 ||  || — || September 16, 2001 || Socorro || LINEAR || FLO || align=right data-sort-value="0.94" | 940 m || 
|-id=491 bgcolor=#fefefe
| 283491 ||  || — || September 16, 2001 || Socorro || LINEAR || — || align=right data-sort-value="0.98" | 980 m || 
|-id=492 bgcolor=#fefefe
| 283492 ||  || — || September 16, 2001 || Socorro || LINEAR || NYS || align=right data-sort-value="0.85" | 850 m || 
|-id=493 bgcolor=#fefefe
| 283493 ||  || — || September 16, 2001 || Socorro || LINEAR || ERI || align=right | 2.0 km || 
|-id=494 bgcolor=#fefefe
| 283494 ||  || — || September 17, 2001 || Socorro || LINEAR || H || align=right | 1.0 km || 
|-id=495 bgcolor=#fefefe
| 283495 ||  || — || September 17, 2001 || Socorro || LINEAR || FLO || align=right data-sort-value="0.94" | 940 m || 
|-id=496 bgcolor=#d6d6d6
| 283496 ||  || — || September 17, 2001 || Socorro || LINEAR || — || align=right | 4.1 km || 
|-id=497 bgcolor=#fefefe
| 283497 ||  || — || September 19, 2001 || Socorro || LINEAR || — || align=right data-sort-value="0.71" | 710 m || 
|-id=498 bgcolor=#d6d6d6
| 283498 ||  || — || September 19, 2001 || Socorro || LINEAR || — || align=right | 3.4 km || 
|-id=499 bgcolor=#d6d6d6
| 283499 ||  || — || September 19, 2001 || Socorro || LINEAR || — || align=right | 3.9 km || 
|-id=500 bgcolor=#d6d6d6
| 283500 ||  || — || September 20, 2001 || Socorro || LINEAR || EOS || align=right | 2.3 km || 
|}

283501–283600 

|-bgcolor=#fefefe
| 283501 ||  || — || September 24, 2001 || Socorro || LINEAR || PHO || align=right | 3.3 km || 
|-id=502 bgcolor=#fefefe
| 283502 ||  || — || September 29, 2001 || Palomar || NEAT || — || align=right | 1.2 km || 
|-id=503 bgcolor=#fefefe
| 283503 ||  || — || September 20, 2001 || Socorro || LINEAR || — || align=right data-sort-value="0.91" | 910 m || 
|-id=504 bgcolor=#d6d6d6
| 283504 ||  || — || September 22, 2001 || Socorro || LINEAR || — || align=right | 3.9 km || 
|-id=505 bgcolor=#fefefe
| 283505 ||  || — || September 16, 2001 || Socorro || LINEAR || V || align=right data-sort-value="0.66" | 660 m || 
|-id=506 bgcolor=#d6d6d6
| 283506 ||  || — || September 20, 2001 || Kitt Peak || Spacewatch || — || align=right | 2.7 km || 
|-id=507 bgcolor=#d6d6d6
| 283507 ||  || — || September 20, 2001 || Socorro || LINEAR || — || align=right | 2.1 km || 
|-id=508 bgcolor=#fefefe
| 283508 ||  || — || September 21, 2001 || Socorro || LINEAR || NYS || align=right data-sort-value="0.47" | 470 m || 
|-id=509 bgcolor=#fefefe
| 283509 ||  || — || September 25, 2001 || Palomar || NEAT || — || align=right | 1.3 km || 
|-id=510 bgcolor=#C2FFFF
| 283510 ||  || — || September 19, 2001 || Palomar || NEAT || L5 || align=right | 14 km || 
|-id=511 bgcolor=#d6d6d6
| 283511 ||  || — || October 12, 2001 || Ondřejov || P. Kušnirák || — || align=right | 3.5 km || 
|-id=512 bgcolor=#C2FFFF
| 283512 ||  || — || October 14, 2001 || Socorro || LINEAR || L5 || align=right | 15 km || 
|-id=513 bgcolor=#C2FFFF
| 283513 ||  || — || October 14, 2001 || Socorro || LINEAR || L5 || align=right | 15 km || 
|-id=514 bgcolor=#fefefe
| 283514 ||  || — || October 14, 2001 || Socorro || LINEAR || FLO || align=right data-sort-value="0.73" | 730 m || 
|-id=515 bgcolor=#fefefe
| 283515 ||  || — || October 14, 2001 || Socorro || LINEAR || — || align=right data-sort-value="0.98" | 980 m || 
|-id=516 bgcolor=#d6d6d6
| 283516 ||  || — || October 14, 2001 || Socorro || LINEAR || HYG || align=right | 3.6 km || 
|-id=517 bgcolor=#d6d6d6
| 283517 ||  || — || October 14, 2001 || Socorro || LINEAR || HYG || align=right | 4.1 km || 
|-id=518 bgcolor=#d6d6d6
| 283518 ||  || — || October 14, 2001 || Socorro || LINEAR || — || align=right | 5.5 km || 
|-id=519 bgcolor=#C2FFFF
| 283519 ||  || — || October 14, 2001 || Cima Ekar || ADAS || L5 || align=right | 13 km || 
|-id=520 bgcolor=#fefefe
| 283520 ||  || — || October 14, 2001 || Cima Ekar || ADAS || V || align=right data-sort-value="0.79" | 790 m || 
|-id=521 bgcolor=#d6d6d6
| 283521 ||  || — || October 14, 2001 || Socorro || LINEAR || — || align=right | 3.9 km || 
|-id=522 bgcolor=#fefefe
| 283522 ||  || — || October 14, 2001 || Socorro || LINEAR || — || align=right data-sort-value="0.77" | 770 m || 
|-id=523 bgcolor=#fefefe
| 283523 ||  || — || October 14, 2001 || Socorro || LINEAR || — || align=right | 1.2 km || 
|-id=524 bgcolor=#d6d6d6
| 283524 ||  || — || October 15, 2001 || Socorro || LINEAR || — || align=right | 3.7 km || 
|-id=525 bgcolor=#d6d6d6
| 283525 ||  || — || October 15, 2001 || Socorro || LINEAR || — || align=right | 5.3 km || 
|-id=526 bgcolor=#fefefe
| 283526 ||  || — || October 15, 2001 || Kitt Peak || Spacewatch || V || align=right data-sort-value="0.84" | 840 m || 
|-id=527 bgcolor=#d6d6d6
| 283527 ||  || — || October 10, 2001 || Palomar || NEAT || — || align=right | 3.4 km || 
|-id=528 bgcolor=#fefefe
| 283528 ||  || — || October 10, 2001 || Palomar || NEAT || FLO || align=right data-sort-value="0.94" | 940 m || 
|-id=529 bgcolor=#d6d6d6
| 283529 ||  || — || October 14, 2001 || Socorro || LINEAR || — || align=right | 3.2 km || 
|-id=530 bgcolor=#fefefe
| 283530 ||  || — || October 14, 2001 || Socorro || LINEAR || FLO || align=right data-sort-value="0.74" | 740 m || 
|-id=531 bgcolor=#d6d6d6
| 283531 ||  || — || October 14, 2001 || Socorro || LINEAR || EOS || align=right | 3.1 km || 
|-id=532 bgcolor=#C2FFFF
| 283532 ||  || — || October 14, 2001 || Socorro || LINEAR || L5 || align=right | 13 km || 
|-id=533 bgcolor=#d6d6d6
| 283533 ||  || — || October 15, 2001 || Socorro || LINEAR || — || align=right | 4.0 km || 
|-id=534 bgcolor=#fefefe
| 283534 ||  || — || October 11, 2001 || Palomar || NEAT || — || align=right data-sort-value="0.71" | 710 m || 
|-id=535 bgcolor=#d6d6d6
| 283535 ||  || — || October 13, 2001 || Palomar || NEAT || — || align=right | 4.1 km || 
|-id=536 bgcolor=#fefefe
| 283536 ||  || — || October 14, 2001 || Socorro || LINEAR || — || align=right data-sort-value="0.91" | 910 m || 
|-id=537 bgcolor=#fefefe
| 283537 ||  || — || October 14, 2001 || Socorro || LINEAR || — || align=right data-sort-value="0.64" | 640 m || 
|-id=538 bgcolor=#C2FFFF
| 283538 ||  || — || October 15, 2001 || Kitt Peak || Spacewatch || L5 || align=right | 12 km || 
|-id=539 bgcolor=#fefefe
| 283539 ||  || — || October 13, 2001 || Anderson Mesa || LONEOS || FLO || align=right data-sort-value="0.72" | 720 m || 
|-id=540 bgcolor=#fefefe
| 283540 ||  || — || October 16, 2001 || Palomar || NEAT || — || align=right | 1.1 km || 
|-id=541 bgcolor=#d6d6d6
| 283541 ||  || — || October 17, 2001 || Socorro || LINEAR || — || align=right | 4.1 km || 
|-id=542 bgcolor=#d6d6d6
| 283542 ||  || — || October 17, 2001 || Socorro || LINEAR || — || align=right | 5.0 km || 
|-id=543 bgcolor=#C2FFFF
| 283543 ||  || — || October 17, 2001 || Socorro || LINEAR || L5 || align=right | 9.9 km || 
|-id=544 bgcolor=#d6d6d6
| 283544 ||  || — || October 22, 2001 || Palomar || NEAT || EOS || align=right | 2.8 km || 
|-id=545 bgcolor=#d6d6d6
| 283545 ||  || — || October 17, 2001 || Socorro || LINEAR || — || align=right | 3.1 km || 
|-id=546 bgcolor=#FA8072
| 283546 ||  || — || October 22, 2001 || Socorro || LINEAR || H || align=right | 1.0 km || 
|-id=547 bgcolor=#d6d6d6
| 283547 ||  || — || October 22, 2001 || Palomar || NEAT || — || align=right | 3.9 km || 
|-id=548 bgcolor=#fefefe
| 283548 ||  || — || October 20, 2001 || Socorro || LINEAR || — || align=right data-sort-value="0.91" | 910 m || 
|-id=549 bgcolor=#C2FFFF
| 283549 ||  || — || October 21, 2001 || Socorro || LINEAR || L5 || align=right | 11 km || 
|-id=550 bgcolor=#d6d6d6
| 283550 ||  || — || October 23, 2001 || Socorro || LINEAR || — || align=right | 2.5 km || 
|-id=551 bgcolor=#fefefe
| 283551 ||  || — || October 18, 2001 || Palomar || NEAT || V || align=right data-sort-value="0.68" | 680 m || 
|-id=552 bgcolor=#fefefe
| 283552 ||  || — || October 21, 2001 || Socorro || LINEAR || NYS || align=right data-sort-value="0.79" | 790 m || 
|-id=553 bgcolor=#C2FFFF
| 283553 ||  || — || October 16, 2001 || Palomar || NEAT || L5 || align=right | 9.1 km || 
|-id=554 bgcolor=#d6d6d6
| 283554 ||  || — || October 16, 2001 || Palomar || NEAT || — || align=right | 3.4 km || 
|-id=555 bgcolor=#d6d6d6
| 283555 ||  || — || October 23, 2001 || Palomar || NEAT || — || align=right | 2.4 km || 
|-id=556 bgcolor=#fefefe
| 283556 ||  || — || November 8, 2001 || Socorro || LINEAR || H || align=right | 1.2 km || 
|-id=557 bgcolor=#FA8072
| 283557 ||  || — || November 9, 2001 || Socorro || LINEAR || — || align=right | 1.6 km || 
|-id=558 bgcolor=#fefefe
| 283558 ||  || — || November 9, 2001 || Socorro || LINEAR || V || align=right data-sort-value="0.95" | 950 m || 
|-id=559 bgcolor=#d6d6d6
| 283559 ||  || — || November 9, 2001 || Socorro || LINEAR || — || align=right | 4.3 km || 
|-id=560 bgcolor=#C2FFFF
| 283560 ||  || — || November 10, 2001 || Socorro || LINEAR || L5 || align=right | 13 km || 
|-id=561 bgcolor=#fefefe
| 283561 ||  || — || November 10, 2001 || Socorro || LINEAR || — || align=right | 1.1 km || 
|-id=562 bgcolor=#E9E9E9
| 283562 ||  || — || November 10, 2001 || Socorro || LINEAR || — || align=right | 4.4 km || 
|-id=563 bgcolor=#d6d6d6
| 283563 ||  || — || November 10, 2001 || Socorro || LINEAR || — || align=right | 4.6 km || 
|-id=564 bgcolor=#d6d6d6
| 283564 ||  || — || November 11, 2001 || Socorro || LINEAR || TIR || align=right | 3.9 km || 
|-id=565 bgcolor=#d6d6d6
| 283565 ||  || — || November 15, 2001 || Socorro || LINEAR || — || align=right | 3.5 km || 
|-id=566 bgcolor=#fefefe
| 283566 ||  || — || October 21, 2001 || Socorro || LINEAR || — || align=right data-sort-value="0.90" | 900 m || 
|-id=567 bgcolor=#fefefe
| 283567 ||  || — || November 12, 2001 || Socorro || LINEAR || — || align=right data-sort-value="0.74" | 740 m || 
|-id=568 bgcolor=#fefefe
| 283568 ||  || — || November 11, 2001 || Apache Point || SDSS || V || align=right data-sort-value="0.76" | 760 m || 
|-id=569 bgcolor=#fefefe
| 283569 ||  || — || November 11, 2001 || Apache Point || SDSS || V || align=right data-sort-value="0.74" | 740 m || 
|-id=570 bgcolor=#d6d6d6
| 283570 ||  || — || November 17, 2001 || Socorro || LINEAR || — || align=right | 4.8 km || 
|-id=571 bgcolor=#d6d6d6
| 283571 ||  || — || November 17, 2001 || Socorro || LINEAR || THM || align=right | 3.0 km || 
|-id=572 bgcolor=#d6d6d6
| 283572 ||  || — || November 20, 2001 || Socorro || LINEAR || THM || align=right | 2.8 km || 
|-id=573 bgcolor=#fefefe
| 283573 ||  || — || November 20, 2001 || Socorro || LINEAR || — || align=right data-sort-value="0.96" | 960 m || 
|-id=574 bgcolor=#fefefe
| 283574 ||  || — || December 9, 2001 || Socorro || LINEAR || — || align=right | 1.4 km || 
|-id=575 bgcolor=#d6d6d6
| 283575 ||  || — || December 7, 2001 || Kitt Peak || Spacewatch || THM || align=right | 3.0 km || 
|-id=576 bgcolor=#fefefe
| 283576 ||  || — || December 9, 2001 || Socorro || LINEAR || — || align=right | 1.3 km || 
|-id=577 bgcolor=#E9E9E9
| 283577 ||  || — || December 10, 2001 || Socorro || LINEAR || — || align=right | 2.7 km || 
|-id=578 bgcolor=#d6d6d6
| 283578 ||  || — || December 11, 2001 || Socorro || LINEAR || — || align=right | 4.3 km || 
|-id=579 bgcolor=#d6d6d6
| 283579 ||  || — || December 11, 2001 || Socorro || LINEAR || — || align=right | 3.9 km || 
|-id=580 bgcolor=#d6d6d6
| 283580 ||  || — || December 10, 2001 || Socorro || LINEAR || — || align=right | 4.5 km || 
|-id=581 bgcolor=#d6d6d6
| 283581 ||  || — || December 11, 2001 || Socorro || LINEAR || — || align=right | 3.7 km || 
|-id=582 bgcolor=#fefefe
| 283582 ||  || — || December 14, 2001 || Socorro || LINEAR || — || align=right | 1.2 km || 
|-id=583 bgcolor=#fefefe
| 283583 ||  || — || December 14, 2001 || Socorro || LINEAR || H || align=right data-sort-value="0.75" | 750 m || 
|-id=584 bgcolor=#E9E9E9
| 283584 ||  || — || December 14, 2001 || Socorro || LINEAR || EUN || align=right | 2.3 km || 
|-id=585 bgcolor=#fefefe
| 283585 ||  || — || December 15, 2001 || Socorro || LINEAR || V || align=right data-sort-value="0.94" | 940 m || 
|-id=586 bgcolor=#d6d6d6
| 283586 ||  || — || December 11, 2001 || Socorro || LINEAR || — || align=right | 5.1 km || 
|-id=587 bgcolor=#d6d6d6
| 283587 ||  || — || December 15, 2001 || Socorro || LINEAR || TIR || align=right | 4.1 km || 
|-id=588 bgcolor=#E9E9E9
| 283588 ||  || — || December 15, 2001 || Socorro || LINEAR || — || align=right | 1.8 km || 
|-id=589 bgcolor=#d6d6d6
| 283589 ||  || — || December 15, 2001 || Socorro || LINEAR || — || align=right | 4.2 km || 
|-id=590 bgcolor=#d6d6d6
| 283590 ||  || — || December 14, 2001 || Socorro || LINEAR || — || align=right | 4.2 km || 
|-id=591 bgcolor=#fefefe
| 283591 ||  || — || December 15, 2001 || Socorro || LINEAR || — || align=right | 1.2 km || 
|-id=592 bgcolor=#d6d6d6
| 283592 ||  || — || December 13, 2001 || Palomar || NEAT || — || align=right | 3.3 km || 
|-id=593 bgcolor=#fefefe
| 283593 ||  || — || December 23, 2001 || Kingsnake || J. V. McClusky || H || align=right data-sort-value="0.75" | 750 m || 
|-id=594 bgcolor=#d6d6d6
| 283594 ||  || — || December 17, 2001 || Socorro || LINEAR || — || align=right | 5.6 km || 
|-id=595 bgcolor=#fefefe
| 283595 ||  || — || December 17, 2001 || Socorro || LINEAR || V || align=right data-sort-value="0.89" | 890 m || 
|-id=596 bgcolor=#d6d6d6
| 283596 ||  || — || December 18, 2001 || Socorro || LINEAR || HYG || align=right | 3.8 km || 
|-id=597 bgcolor=#fefefe
| 283597 ||  || — || December 18, 2001 || Socorro || LINEAR || FLO || align=right data-sort-value="0.88" | 880 m || 
|-id=598 bgcolor=#fefefe
| 283598 ||  || — || December 18, 2001 || Socorro || LINEAR || V || align=right data-sort-value="0.99" | 990 m || 
|-id=599 bgcolor=#fefefe
| 283599 ||  || — || December 17, 2001 || Socorro || LINEAR || MAS || align=right | 1.1 km || 
|-id=600 bgcolor=#d6d6d6
| 283600 ||  || — || December 22, 2001 || Socorro || LINEAR || — || align=right | 5.5 km || 
|}

283601–283700 

|-bgcolor=#d6d6d6
| 283601 ||  || — || December 20, 2001 || Haleakala || NEAT || — || align=right | 3.2 km || 
|-id=602 bgcolor=#d6d6d6
| 283602 ||  || — || December 18, 2001 || Socorro || LINEAR || TIR || align=right | 4.4 km || 
|-id=603 bgcolor=#E9E9E9
| 283603 ||  || — || December 19, 2001 || Anderson Mesa || LONEOS || EUN || align=right | 1.7 km || 
|-id=604 bgcolor=#fefefe
| 283604 ||  || — || January 9, 2002 || Socorro || LINEAR || — || align=right | 1.2 km || 
|-id=605 bgcolor=#fefefe
| 283605 ||  || — || January 8, 2002 || Socorro || LINEAR || — || align=right data-sort-value="0.94" | 940 m || 
|-id=606 bgcolor=#fefefe
| 283606 ||  || — || January 8, 2002 || Socorro || LINEAR || — || align=right | 1.9 km || 
|-id=607 bgcolor=#fefefe
| 283607 ||  || — || January 8, 2002 || Socorro || LINEAR || — || align=right | 1.1 km || 
|-id=608 bgcolor=#fefefe
| 283608 ||  || — || January 14, 2002 || Socorro || LINEAR || H || align=right data-sort-value="0.81" | 810 m || 
|-id=609 bgcolor=#E9E9E9
| 283609 ||  || — || January 14, 2002 || Socorro || LINEAR || — || align=right | 2.0 km || 
|-id=610 bgcolor=#fefefe
| 283610 ||  || — || February 5, 2002 || Palomar || NEAT || — || align=right | 1.1 km || 
|-id=611 bgcolor=#d6d6d6
| 283611 ||  || — || February 5, 2002 || Haleakala || NEAT || — || align=right | 6.2 km || 
|-id=612 bgcolor=#fefefe
| 283612 ||  || — || February 8, 2002 || Socorro || LINEAR || H || align=right | 1.0 km || 
|-id=613 bgcolor=#E9E9E9
| 283613 ||  || — || February 3, 2002 || Haleakala || NEAT || — || align=right | 2.8 km || 
|-id=614 bgcolor=#E9E9E9
| 283614 ||  || — || February 12, 2002 || Desert Eagle || W. K. Y. Yeung || — || align=right | 1.8 km || 
|-id=615 bgcolor=#E9E9E9
| 283615 ||  || — || February 7, 2002 || Socorro || LINEAR || BRU || align=right | 3.2 km || 
|-id=616 bgcolor=#E9E9E9
| 283616 ||  || — || February 7, 2002 || Socorro || LINEAR || ADE || align=right | 2.1 km || 
|-id=617 bgcolor=#E9E9E9
| 283617 ||  || — || February 7, 2002 || Socorro || LINEAR || GEF || align=right | 1.7 km || 
|-id=618 bgcolor=#d6d6d6
| 283618 ||  || — || February 8, 2002 || Socorro || LINEAR || Tj (2.97) || align=right | 5.5 km || 
|-id=619 bgcolor=#fefefe
| 283619 ||  || — || February 9, 2002 || Socorro || LINEAR || — || align=right | 1.3 km || 
|-id=620 bgcolor=#fefefe
| 283620 ||  || — || February 8, 2002 || Kitt Peak || Spacewatch || — || align=right data-sort-value="0.89" | 890 m || 
|-id=621 bgcolor=#E9E9E9
| 283621 ||  || — || February 8, 2002 || Socorro || LINEAR || — || align=right | 1.4 km || 
|-id=622 bgcolor=#fefefe
| 283622 ||  || — || February 10, 2002 || Socorro || LINEAR || — || align=right | 1.3 km || 
|-id=623 bgcolor=#fefefe
| 283623 ||  || — || February 10, 2002 || Socorro || LINEAR || V || align=right | 1.0 km || 
|-id=624 bgcolor=#fefefe
| 283624 ||  || — || February 10, 2002 || Socorro || LINEAR || — || align=right | 1.1 km || 
|-id=625 bgcolor=#E9E9E9
| 283625 ||  || — || February 10, 2002 || Socorro || LINEAR || — || align=right | 2.5 km || 
|-id=626 bgcolor=#FA8072
| 283626 ||  || — || February 10, 2002 || Socorro || LINEAR || — || align=right | 1.4 km || 
|-id=627 bgcolor=#E9E9E9
| 283627 ||  || — || February 12, 2002 || Kitt Peak || Spacewatch || — || align=right | 1.1 km || 
|-id=628 bgcolor=#E9E9E9
| 283628 ||  || — || February 8, 2002 || Kitt Peak || M. W. Buie || MIS || align=right | 2.7 km || 
|-id=629 bgcolor=#fefefe
| 283629 ||  || — || February 8, 2002 || Kitt Peak || Spacewatch || — || align=right | 1.1 km || 
|-id=630 bgcolor=#fefefe
| 283630 ||  || — || February 6, 2002 || Palomar || NEAT || — || align=right | 1.3 km || 
|-id=631 bgcolor=#E9E9E9
| 283631 ||  || — || February 20, 2002 || Socorro || LINEAR || — || align=right | 1.4 km || 
|-id=632 bgcolor=#fefefe
| 283632 ||  || — || February 20, 2002 || Anderson Mesa || LONEOS || H || align=right data-sort-value="0.97" | 970 m || 
|-id=633 bgcolor=#E9E9E9
| 283633 ||  || — || March 10, 2002 || Cima Ekar || ADAS || — || align=right | 1.1 km || 
|-id=634 bgcolor=#E9E9E9
| 283634 ||  || — || March 9, 2002 || Socorro || LINEAR || — || align=right | 2.5 km || 
|-id=635 bgcolor=#E9E9E9
| 283635 ||  || — || March 12, 2002 || Palomar || NEAT || — || align=right | 2.5 km || 
|-id=636 bgcolor=#E9E9E9
| 283636 ||  || — || March 10, 2002 || Kitt Peak || Spacewatch || CLO || align=right | 2.0 km || 
|-id=637 bgcolor=#E9E9E9
| 283637 ||  || — || March 9, 2002 || Anderson Mesa || LONEOS || — || align=right | 3.0 km || 
|-id=638 bgcolor=#E9E9E9
| 283638 ||  || — || March 19, 2002 || Socorro || LINEAR || — || align=right | 1.6 km || 
|-id=639 bgcolor=#E9E9E9
| 283639 ||  || — || March 19, 2002 || Palomar || NEAT || — || align=right | 2.3 km || 
|-id=640 bgcolor=#E9E9E9
| 283640 ||  || — || April 15, 2002 || Socorro || LINEAR || — || align=right | 1.5 km || 
|-id=641 bgcolor=#E9E9E9
| 283641 ||  || — || April 5, 2002 || Palomar || NEAT || — || align=right | 2.2 km || 
|-id=642 bgcolor=#E9E9E9
| 283642 ||  || — || April 5, 2002 || Palomar || NEAT || — || align=right | 1.5 km || 
|-id=643 bgcolor=#E9E9E9
| 283643 ||  || — || April 9, 2002 || Anderson Mesa || LONEOS || — || align=right | 1.5 km || 
|-id=644 bgcolor=#E9E9E9
| 283644 ||  || — || April 12, 2002 || Socorro || LINEAR || — || align=right | 1.6 km || 
|-id=645 bgcolor=#E9E9E9
| 283645 ||  || — || April 5, 2002 || Palomar || NEAT || — || align=right | 2.4 km || 
|-id=646 bgcolor=#E9E9E9
| 283646 ||  || — || April 18, 2002 || Kitt Peak || Spacewatch || — || align=right | 2.1 km || 
|-id=647 bgcolor=#E9E9E9
| 283647 ||  || — || May 7, 2002 || Anderson Mesa || LONEOS || — || align=right | 1.4 km || 
|-id=648 bgcolor=#E9E9E9
| 283648 ||  || — || May 11, 2002 || Socorro || LINEAR || — || align=right | 2.2 km || 
|-id=649 bgcolor=#E9E9E9
| 283649 ||  || — || May 14, 2002 || Palomar || NEAT || JUN || align=right | 1.4 km || 
|-id=650 bgcolor=#E9E9E9
| 283650 ||  || — || September 15, 2007 || Kitt Peak || Spacewatch || MIS || align=right | 2.6 km || 
|-id=651 bgcolor=#E9E9E9
| 283651 ||  || — || May 19, 2002 || Palomar || NEAT || — || align=right | 2.1 km || 
|-id=652 bgcolor=#E9E9E9
| 283652 ||  || — || May 18, 2002 || Palomar || NEAT || VIB || align=right | 1.8 km || 
|-id=653 bgcolor=#E9E9E9
| 283653 ||  || — || June 6, 2002 || Socorro || LINEAR || — || align=right | 1.7 km || 
|-id=654 bgcolor=#E9E9E9
| 283654 ||  || — || June 10, 2002 || Socorro || LINEAR || — || align=right | 2.4 km || 
|-id=655 bgcolor=#E9E9E9
| 283655 ||  || — || June 11, 2002 || Palomar || NEAT || — || align=right | 2.2 km || 
|-id=656 bgcolor=#E9E9E9
| 283656 ||  || — || June 16, 2002 || Palomar || NEAT || — || align=right | 2.4 km || 
|-id=657 bgcolor=#E9E9E9
| 283657 ||  || — || July 12, 2002 || Palomar || NEAT || — || align=right | 2.8 km || 
|-id=658 bgcolor=#E9E9E9
| 283658 ||  || — || July 18, 2002 || Socorro || LINEAR || — || align=right | 3.1 km || 
|-id=659 bgcolor=#E9E9E9
| 283659 ||  || — || July 18, 2002 || Palomar || NEAT || WIT || align=right | 1.1 km || 
|-id=660 bgcolor=#E9E9E9
| 283660 ||  || — || August 3, 2002 || Palomar || NEAT || — || align=right | 2.2 km || 
|-id=661 bgcolor=#E9E9E9
| 283661 ||  || — || August 6, 2002 || Palomar || NEAT || — || align=right | 3.1 km || 
|-id=662 bgcolor=#E9E9E9
| 283662 ||  || — || August 6, 2002 || Palomar || NEAT || MRX || align=right | 1.7 km || 
|-id=663 bgcolor=#E9E9E9
| 283663 ||  || — || August 11, 2002 || Socorro || LINEAR || — || align=right | 3.2 km || 
|-id=664 bgcolor=#E9E9E9
| 283664 ||  || — || August 13, 2002 || Socorro || LINEAR || — || align=right | 4.5 km || 
|-id=665 bgcolor=#E9E9E9
| 283665 ||  || — || August 14, 2002 || Socorro || LINEAR || — || align=right | 2.4 km || 
|-id=666 bgcolor=#E9E9E9
| 283666 ||  || — || August 12, 2002 || Socorro || LINEAR || GEF || align=right | 1.6 km || 
|-id=667 bgcolor=#E9E9E9
| 283667 ||  || — || August 13, 2002 || Kitt Peak || Spacewatch || — || align=right | 3.3 km || 
|-id=668 bgcolor=#E9E9E9
| 283668 ||  || — || August 15, 2002 || Kitt Peak || Spacewatch || AGN || align=right | 1.3 km || 
|-id=669 bgcolor=#E9E9E9
| 283669 ||  || — || August 13, 2002 || Anderson Mesa || LONEOS || CLO || align=right | 3.3 km || 
|-id=670 bgcolor=#E9E9E9
| 283670 ||  || — || August 15, 2002 || Anderson Mesa || LONEOS || — || align=right | 2.2 km || 
|-id=671 bgcolor=#E9E9E9
| 283671 ||  || — || August 8, 2002 || Palomar || S. F. Hönig || — || align=right | 3.1 km || 
|-id=672 bgcolor=#E9E9E9
| 283672 ||  || — || August 7, 2002 || Palomar || NEAT || — || align=right | 2.3 km || 
|-id=673 bgcolor=#E9E9E9
| 283673 ||  || — || August 8, 2002 || Palomar || NEAT || — || align=right | 2.0 km || 
|-id=674 bgcolor=#E9E9E9
| 283674 ||  || — || August 16, 2002 || Palomar || NEAT || DOR || align=right | 4.7 km || 
|-id=675 bgcolor=#E9E9E9
| 283675 ||  || — || August 26, 2002 || Palomar || NEAT || WIT || align=right | 1.3 km || 
|-id=676 bgcolor=#E9E9E9
| 283676 ||  || — || August 29, 2002 || Palomar || NEAT || — || align=right | 2.1 km || 
|-id=677 bgcolor=#E9E9E9
| 283677 ||  || — || August 19, 2002 || Palomar || S. F. Hönig || — || align=right | 2.8 km || 
|-id=678 bgcolor=#E9E9E9
| 283678 ||  || — || August 29, 2002 || Palomar || S. F. Hönig || — || align=right | 2.2 km || 
|-id=679 bgcolor=#E9E9E9
| 283679 ||  || — || August 30, 2002 || Palomar || NEAT || HOF || align=right | 3.4 km || 
|-id=680 bgcolor=#E9E9E9
| 283680 ||  || — || August 16, 2002 || Palomar || NEAT || HEN || align=right | 1.4 km || 
|-id=681 bgcolor=#E9E9E9
| 283681 ||  || — || August 19, 2002 || Palomar || NEAT || — || align=right | 2.6 km || 
|-id=682 bgcolor=#E9E9E9
| 283682 ||  || — || August 26, 2002 || Palomar || NEAT || — || align=right | 2.9 km || 
|-id=683 bgcolor=#d6d6d6
| 283683 ||  || — || August 27, 2002 || Palomar || NEAT || — || align=right | 3.5 km || 
|-id=684 bgcolor=#E9E9E9
| 283684 ||  || — || August 28, 2002 || Palomar || NEAT || AEO || align=right | 1.3 km || 
|-id=685 bgcolor=#E9E9E9
| 283685 ||  || — || August 16, 2002 || Palomar || NEAT || — || align=right | 2.4 km || 
|-id=686 bgcolor=#E9E9E9
| 283686 ||  || — || August 29, 2002 || Palomar || NEAT || WIT || align=right | 1.3 km || 
|-id=687 bgcolor=#E9E9E9
| 283687 ||  || — || August 17, 2002 || Palomar || NEAT || — || align=right | 2.6 km || 
|-id=688 bgcolor=#E9E9E9
| 283688 ||  || — || March 4, 2005 || Kitt Peak || Spacewatch || HOF || align=right | 3.2 km || 
|-id=689 bgcolor=#d6d6d6
| 283689 ||  || — || September 4, 2002 || Anderson Mesa || LONEOS || — || align=right | 3.6 km || 
|-id=690 bgcolor=#E9E9E9
| 283690 ||  || — || September 5, 2002 || Anderson Mesa || LONEOS || — || align=right | 2.4 km || 
|-id=691 bgcolor=#E9E9E9
| 283691 ||  || — || September 5, 2002 || Socorro || LINEAR || — || align=right | 3.2 km || 
|-id=692 bgcolor=#E9E9E9
| 283692 ||  || — || September 6, 2002 || Socorro || LINEAR || — || align=right | 3.4 km || 
|-id=693 bgcolor=#E9E9E9
| 283693 ||  || — || September 6, 2002 || Socorro || LINEAR || — || align=right | 3.2 km || 
|-id=694 bgcolor=#E9E9E9
| 283694 ||  || — || September 6, 2002 || Socorro || LINEAR || critical || align=right | 1.6 km || 
|-id=695 bgcolor=#E9E9E9
| 283695 ||  || — || September 10, 2002 || Palomar || NEAT || — || align=right | 3.0 km || 
|-id=696 bgcolor=#E9E9E9
| 283696 ||  || — || September 11, 2002 || Palomar || NEAT || AGN || align=right | 1.3 km || 
|-id=697 bgcolor=#E9E9E9
| 283697 ||  || — || September 11, 2002 || Palomar || NEAT || — || align=right | 3.5 km || 
|-id=698 bgcolor=#E9E9E9
| 283698 ||  || — || September 12, 2002 || Palomar || NEAT || GEF || align=right | 1.6 km || 
|-id=699 bgcolor=#E9E9E9
| 283699 ||  || — || September 15, 2002 || Palomar || NEAT || — || align=right | 2.0 km || 
|-id=700 bgcolor=#E9E9E9
| 283700 ||  || — || September 8, 2002 || Haleakala || R. Matson || — || align=right | 4.0 km || 
|}

283701–283800 

|-bgcolor=#E9E9E9
| 283701 ||  || — || September 4, 2002 || Palomar || NEAT || GEF || align=right | 1.5 km || 
|-id=702 bgcolor=#E9E9E9
| 283702 ||  || — || September 14, 2002 || Palomar || NEAT || — || align=right | 2.1 km || 
|-id=703 bgcolor=#E9E9E9
| 283703 ||  || — || September 15, 2002 || Palomar || NEAT || — || align=right | 2.2 km || 
|-id=704 bgcolor=#E9E9E9
| 283704 ||  || — || September 4, 2002 || Palomar || NEAT || — || align=right | 1.8 km || 
|-id=705 bgcolor=#E9E9E9
| 283705 ||  || — || September 20, 2002 || Palomar || NEAT || — || align=right | 4.2 km || 
|-id=706 bgcolor=#E9E9E9
| 283706 ||  || — || September 27, 2002 || Palomar || NEAT || — || align=right | 2.5 km || 
|-id=707 bgcolor=#E9E9E9
| 283707 ||  || — || September 27, 2002 || Palomar || NEAT || HNA || align=right | 2.3 km || 
|-id=708 bgcolor=#E9E9E9
| 283708 ||  || — || September 30, 2002 || Socorro || LINEAR || — || align=right | 3.2 km || 
|-id=709 bgcolor=#fefefe
| 283709 ||  || — || October 2, 2002 || Socorro || LINEAR || — || align=right data-sort-value="0.93" | 930 m || 
|-id=710 bgcolor=#E9E9E9
| 283710 ||  || — || October 2, 2002 || Socorro || LINEAR || — || align=right | 3.7 km || 
|-id=711 bgcolor=#E9E9E9
| 283711 ||  || — || October 3, 2002 || Socorro || LINEAR || AGN || align=right | 1.4 km || 
|-id=712 bgcolor=#E9E9E9
| 283712 ||  || — || October 4, 2002 || Socorro || LINEAR || — || align=right | 3.1 km || 
|-id=713 bgcolor=#E9E9E9
| 283713 ||  || — || October 1, 2002 || Haleakala || NEAT || — || align=right | 4.1 km || 
|-id=714 bgcolor=#E9E9E9
| 283714 ||  || — || October 4, 2002 || Socorro || LINEAR || CLO || align=right | 2.6 km || 
|-id=715 bgcolor=#E9E9E9
| 283715 ||  || — || October 5, 2002 || Socorro || LINEAR || — || align=right | 4.0 km || 
|-id=716 bgcolor=#E9E9E9
| 283716 ||  || — || October 5, 2002 || Palomar || NEAT || — || align=right | 4.0 km || 
|-id=717 bgcolor=#E9E9E9
| 283717 ||  || — || October 5, 2002 || Palomar || NEAT || — || align=right | 2.6 km || 
|-id=718 bgcolor=#E9E9E9
| 283718 ||  || — || October 5, 2002 || Palomar || NEAT || INO || align=right | 2.1 km || 
|-id=719 bgcolor=#d6d6d6
| 283719 ||  || — || October 3, 2002 || Palomar || NEAT || URS || align=right | 5.2 km || 
|-id=720 bgcolor=#E9E9E9
| 283720 ||  || — || October 3, 2002 || Palomar || NEAT || — || align=right | 3.7 km || 
|-id=721 bgcolor=#E9E9E9
| 283721 ||  || — || October 4, 2002 || Palomar || NEAT || — || align=right | 3.5 km || 
|-id=722 bgcolor=#E9E9E9
| 283722 ||  || — || October 4, 2002 || Socorro || LINEAR || — || align=right | 3.9 km || 
|-id=723 bgcolor=#E9E9E9
| 283723 ||  || — || October 5, 2002 || Socorro || LINEAR || — || align=right | 3.3 km || 
|-id=724 bgcolor=#E9E9E9
| 283724 ||  || — || October 5, 2002 || Socorro || LINEAR || — || align=right | 3.0 km || 
|-id=725 bgcolor=#E9E9E9
| 283725 ||  || — || October 8, 2002 || Anderson Mesa || LONEOS || — || align=right | 2.2 km || 
|-id=726 bgcolor=#E9E9E9
| 283726 ||  || — || October 7, 2002 || Palomar || NEAT || — || align=right | 2.8 km || 
|-id=727 bgcolor=#E9E9E9
| 283727 ||  || — || October 10, 2002 || Socorro || LINEAR || — || align=right | 3.6 km || 
|-id=728 bgcolor=#E9E9E9
| 283728 ||  || — || October 5, 2002 || Apache Point || SDSS || — || align=right | 2.8 km || 
|-id=729 bgcolor=#FFC2E0
| 283729 ||  || — || August 19, 2002 || Socorro || LINEAR || AMO +1km || align=right data-sort-value="0.87" | 870 m || 
|-id=730 bgcolor=#E9E9E9
| 283730 ||  || — || November 2, 2002 || Haleakala || NEAT || MRX || align=right | 1.7 km || 
|-id=731 bgcolor=#d6d6d6
| 283731 ||  || — || November 4, 2002 || Palomar || NEAT || — || align=right | 3.1 km || 
|-id=732 bgcolor=#C2FFFF
| 283732 ||  || — || November 7, 2002 || Kitt Peak || Spacewatch || L5 || align=right | 9.9 km || 
|-id=733 bgcolor=#fefefe
| 283733 ||  || — || November 14, 2002 || Palomar || NEAT || — || align=right | 4.4 km || 
|-id=734 bgcolor=#d6d6d6
| 283734 ||  || — || February 19, 2004 || Needville || Needville Obs. || — || align=right | 3.5 km || 
|-id=735 bgcolor=#fefefe
| 283735 ||  || — || November 24, 2002 || Palomar || NEAT || — || align=right data-sort-value="0.80" | 800 m || 
|-id=736 bgcolor=#E9E9E9
| 283736 ||  || — || November 24, 2002 || Palomar || NEAT || — || align=right | 3.5 km || 
|-id=737 bgcolor=#E9E9E9
| 283737 ||  || — || November 24, 2002 || Palomar || NEAT || — || align=right | 3.6 km || 
|-id=738 bgcolor=#d6d6d6
| 283738 ||  || — || December 2, 2002 || Socorro || LINEAR || — || align=right | 3.5 km || 
|-id=739 bgcolor=#E9E9E9
| 283739 ||  || — || December 6, 2002 || Socorro || LINEAR || — || align=right | 4.1 km || 
|-id=740 bgcolor=#d6d6d6
| 283740 ||  || — || December 11, 2002 || Socorro || LINEAR || — || align=right | 4.7 km || 
|-id=741 bgcolor=#fefefe
| 283741 ||  || — || December 14, 2002 || Apache Point || SDSS || — || align=right data-sort-value="0.95" | 950 m || 
|-id=742 bgcolor=#fefefe
| 283742 ||  || — || January 4, 2003 || Socorro || LINEAR || PHO || align=right | 1.6 km || 
|-id=743 bgcolor=#d6d6d6
| 283743 ||  || — || January 7, 2003 || Socorro || LINEAR || — || align=right | 4.4 km || 
|-id=744 bgcolor=#d6d6d6
| 283744 ||  || — || January 7, 2003 || Socorro || LINEAR || — || align=right | 5.4 km || 
|-id=745 bgcolor=#d6d6d6
| 283745 ||  || — || January 26, 2003 || Anderson Mesa || LONEOS || — || align=right | 5.2 km || 
|-id=746 bgcolor=#d6d6d6
| 283746 ||  || — || January 26, 2003 || Haleakala || NEAT || — || align=right | 5.0 km || 
|-id=747 bgcolor=#d6d6d6
| 283747 ||  || — || January 27, 2003 || Anderson Mesa || LONEOS || VER || align=right | 4.0 km || 
|-id=748 bgcolor=#fefefe
| 283748 ||  || — || February 3, 2003 || Palomar || NEAT || FLO || align=right data-sort-value="0.67" | 670 m || 
|-id=749 bgcolor=#fefefe
| 283749 ||  || — || February 9, 2003 || Palomar || NEAT || FLO || align=right data-sort-value="0.93" | 930 m || 
|-id=750 bgcolor=#fefefe
| 283750 ||  || — || February 1, 2003 || Palomar || NEAT || — || align=right | 1.6 km || 
|-id=751 bgcolor=#fefefe
| 283751 ||  || — || February 25, 2003 || Campo Imperatore || CINEOS || FLO || align=right data-sort-value="0.80" | 800 m || 
|-id=752 bgcolor=#fefefe
| 283752 ||  || — || February 22, 2003 || Palomar || NEAT || — || align=right | 1.1 km || 
|-id=753 bgcolor=#fefefe
| 283753 ||  || — || March 6, 2003 || Anderson Mesa || LONEOS || V || align=right data-sort-value="0.97" | 970 m || 
|-id=754 bgcolor=#fefefe
| 283754 ||  || — || March 6, 2003 || Palomar || NEAT || — || align=right data-sort-value="0.99" | 990 m || 
|-id=755 bgcolor=#fefefe
| 283755 ||  || — || March 8, 2003 || Socorro || LINEAR || H || align=right | 1.1 km || 
|-id=756 bgcolor=#fefefe
| 283756 ||  || — || March 9, 2003 || Anderson Mesa || LONEOS || PHO || align=right | 1.5 km || 
|-id=757 bgcolor=#fefefe
| 283757 ||  || — || March 8, 2003 || Kitt Peak || DLS || NYS || align=right data-sort-value="0.86" | 860 m || 
|-id=758 bgcolor=#fefefe
| 283758 ||  || — || March 25, 2003 || Kitt Peak || Spacewatch || MAS || align=right data-sort-value="0.72" | 720 m || 
|-id=759 bgcolor=#fefefe
| 283759 ||  || — || March 25, 2003 || Palomar || NEAT || — || align=right | 1.5 km || 
|-id=760 bgcolor=#fefefe
| 283760 ||  || — || March 26, 2003 || Palomar || NEAT || — || align=right | 1.2 km || 
|-id=761 bgcolor=#fefefe
| 283761 ||  || — || March 26, 2003 || Palomar || NEAT || V || align=right | 1.1 km || 
|-id=762 bgcolor=#fefefe
| 283762 ||  || — || March 29, 2003 || Anderson Mesa || LONEOS || — || align=right | 1.2 km || 
|-id=763 bgcolor=#fefefe
| 283763 ||  || — || March 27, 2003 || Palomar || NEAT || — || align=right | 1.1 km || 
|-id=764 bgcolor=#fefefe
| 283764 ||  || — || April 1, 2003 || Socorro || LINEAR || — || align=right | 1.2 km || 
|-id=765 bgcolor=#fefefe
| 283765 ||  || — || April 9, 2003 || Palomar || NEAT || — || align=right | 1.3 km || 
|-id=766 bgcolor=#fefefe
| 283766 ||  || — || April 10, 2003 || Kitt Peak || Spacewatch || — || align=right | 1.3 km || 
|-id=767 bgcolor=#fefefe
| 283767 ||  || — || April 8, 2003 || Haleakala || NEAT || — || align=right | 1.2 km || 
|-id=768 bgcolor=#fefefe
| 283768 ||  || — || April 26, 2003 || Kitt Peak || Spacewatch || NYS || align=right data-sort-value="0.79" | 790 m || 
|-id=769 bgcolor=#fefefe
| 283769 ||  || — || April 27, 2003 || Anderson Mesa || LONEOS || — || align=right | 1.2 km || 
|-id=770 bgcolor=#fefefe
| 283770 ||  || — || April 27, 2003 || Anderson Mesa || LONEOS || — || align=right | 1.2 km || 
|-id=771 bgcolor=#fefefe
| 283771 ||  || — || May 9, 2003 || Socorro || LINEAR || — || align=right | 2.1 km || 
|-id=772 bgcolor=#fefefe
| 283772 ||  || — || May 9, 2003 || Socorro || LINEAR || — || align=right | 1.9 km || 
|-id=773 bgcolor=#FA8072
| 283773 ||  || — || July 5, 2003 || Socorro || LINEAR || — || align=right | 2.4 km || 
|-id=774 bgcolor=#E9E9E9
| 283774 ||  || — || July 22, 2003 || Campo Imperatore || CINEOS || — || align=right | 1.0 km || 
|-id=775 bgcolor=#E9E9E9
| 283775 ||  || — || July 22, 2003 || Haleakala || NEAT || JUL || align=right | 1.6 km || 
|-id=776 bgcolor=#E9E9E9
| 283776 ||  || — || July 25, 2003 || Socorro || LINEAR || — || align=right | 1.3 km || 
|-id=777 bgcolor=#E9E9E9
| 283777 ||  || — || July 23, 2003 || Socorro || LINEAR || — || align=right | 2.9 km || 
|-id=778 bgcolor=#E9E9E9
| 283778 ||  || — || August 1, 2003 || Socorro || LINEAR || — || align=right | 3.5 km || 
|-id=779 bgcolor=#E9E9E9
| 283779 ||  || — || August 20, 2003 || Reedy Creek || J. Broughton || — || align=right | 1.3 km || 
|-id=780 bgcolor=#E9E9E9
| 283780 ||  || — || August 20, 2003 || Palomar || NEAT || — || align=right | 3.0 km || 
|-id=781 bgcolor=#E9E9E9
| 283781 ||  || — || August 23, 2003 || Socorro || LINEAR || — || align=right | 1.4 km || 
|-id=782 bgcolor=#E9E9E9
| 283782 ||  || — || August 22, 2003 || Socorro || LINEAR || — || align=right | 1.2 km || 
|-id=783 bgcolor=#E9E9E9
| 283783 ||  || — || August 23, 2003 || Socorro || LINEAR || — || align=right | 1.4 km || 
|-id=784 bgcolor=#fefefe
| 283784 ||  || — || August 24, 2003 || Socorro || LINEAR || H || align=right data-sort-value="0.72" | 720 m || 
|-id=785 bgcolor=#E9E9E9
| 283785 ||  || — || August 31, 2003 || Kitt Peak || Spacewatch || — || align=right | 1.2 km || 
|-id=786 bgcolor=#d6d6d6
| 283786 Rutebeuf ||  ||  || August 21, 2003 || Saint-Sulpice || Saint-Sulpice Obs. || HIL3:2 || align=right | 8.5 km || 
|-id=787 bgcolor=#E9E9E9
| 283787 ||  || — || August 31, 2003 || Haleakala || NEAT || — || align=right | 1.3 km || 
|-id=788 bgcolor=#E9E9E9
| 283788 ||  || — || August 30, 2003 || Haleakala || NEAT || — || align=right | 1.8 km || 
|-id=789 bgcolor=#E9E9E9
| 283789 ||  || — || August 31, 2003 || Socorro || LINEAR || — || align=right | 3.4 km || 
|-id=790 bgcolor=#E9E9E9
| 283790 ||  || — || September 2, 2003 || Socorro || LINEAR || — || align=right | 1.8 km || 
|-id=791 bgcolor=#E9E9E9
| 283791 ||  || — || September 13, 2003 || Haleakala || NEAT || — || align=right | 1.4 km || 
|-id=792 bgcolor=#E9E9E9
| 283792 ||  || — || September 15, 2003 || Anderson Mesa || LONEOS || — || align=right | 1.3 km || 
|-id=793 bgcolor=#E9E9E9
| 283793 ||  || — || September 16, 2003 || Kitt Peak || Spacewatch || — || align=right data-sort-value="0.99" | 990 m || 
|-id=794 bgcolor=#E9E9E9
| 283794 ||  || — || September 16, 2003 || Palomar || NEAT || — || align=right | 1.6 km || 
|-id=795 bgcolor=#fefefe
| 283795 ||  || — || September 17, 2003 || Haleakala || NEAT || H || align=right | 1.1 km || 
|-id=796 bgcolor=#E9E9E9
| 283796 ||  || — || September 16, 2003 || Palomar || NEAT || — || align=right | 1.8 km || 
|-id=797 bgcolor=#E9E9E9
| 283797 ||  || — || September 16, 2003 || Anderson Mesa || LONEOS || — || align=right | 1.8 km || 
|-id=798 bgcolor=#E9E9E9
| 283798 ||  || — || September 17, 2003 || Anderson Mesa || LONEOS || — || align=right | 1.2 km || 
|-id=799 bgcolor=#d6d6d6
| 283799 ||  || — || September 19, 2003 || Kitt Peak || Spacewatch || — || align=right | 4.9 km || 
|-id=800 bgcolor=#E9E9E9
| 283800 ||  || — || September 16, 2003 || Palomar || NEAT || JUN || align=right | 1.6 km || 
|}

283801–283900 

|-bgcolor=#d6d6d6
| 283801 ||  || — || September 18, 2003 || Kitt Peak || Spacewatch || — || align=right | 3.9 km || 
|-id=802 bgcolor=#d6d6d6
| 283802 ||  || — || September 20, 2003 || Palomar || NEAT || — || align=right | 4.2 km || 
|-id=803 bgcolor=#E9E9E9
| 283803 ||  || — || September 20, 2003 || Kitt Peak || Spacewatch || — || align=right | 1.4 km || 
|-id=804 bgcolor=#E9E9E9
| 283804 ||  || — || September 16, 2003 || Palomar || NEAT || EUN || align=right | 1.5 km || 
|-id=805 bgcolor=#E9E9E9
| 283805 ||  || — || September 19, 2003 || Kitt Peak || Spacewatch || HNS || align=right | 1.4 km || 
|-id=806 bgcolor=#E9E9E9
| 283806 ||  || — || September 18, 2003 || Palomar || NEAT || — || align=right | 1.7 km || 
|-id=807 bgcolor=#E9E9E9
| 283807 ||  || — || September 20, 2003 || Palomar || NEAT || — || align=right | 1.7 km || 
|-id=808 bgcolor=#E9E9E9
| 283808 ||  || — || September 20, 2003 || Palomar || NEAT || — || align=right | 1.6 km || 
|-id=809 bgcolor=#E9E9E9
| 283809 ||  || — || September 18, 2003 || Palomar || NEAT || — || align=right | 3.7 km || 
|-id=810 bgcolor=#fefefe
| 283810 ||  || — || September 20, 2003 || Črni Vrh || Črni Vrh || H || align=right data-sort-value="0.94" | 940 m || 
|-id=811 bgcolor=#E9E9E9
| 283811 ||  || — || September 22, 2003 || Anderson Mesa || LONEOS || — || align=right | 2.0 km || 
|-id=812 bgcolor=#E9E9E9
| 283812 ||  || — || September 23, 2003 || Palomar || NEAT || — || align=right | 1.2 km || 
|-id=813 bgcolor=#E9E9E9
| 283813 ||  || — || September 25, 2003 || Palomar || NEAT || — || align=right | 1.2 km || 
|-id=814 bgcolor=#E9E9E9
| 283814 ||  || — || September 26, 2003 || Socorro || LINEAR || — || align=right | 1.1 km || 
|-id=815 bgcolor=#E9E9E9
| 283815 ||  || — || September 26, 2003 || Socorro || LINEAR || — || align=right | 2.1 km || 
|-id=816 bgcolor=#E9E9E9
| 283816 ||  || — || September 29, 2003 || Socorro || LINEAR || — || align=right | 1.4 km || 
|-id=817 bgcolor=#E9E9E9
| 283817 ||  || — || September 28, 2003 || Kitt Peak || Spacewatch || — || align=right | 1.6 km || 
|-id=818 bgcolor=#d6d6d6
| 283818 ||  || — || September 18, 2003 || Haleakala || NEAT || THB || align=right | 4.1 km || 
|-id=819 bgcolor=#E9E9E9
| 283819 ||  || — || September 17, 2003 || Palomar || NEAT || — || align=right data-sort-value="0.95" | 950 m || 
|-id=820 bgcolor=#E9E9E9
| 283820 ||  || — || September 30, 2003 || Anderson Mesa || LONEOS || — || align=right | 3.4 km || 
|-id=821 bgcolor=#E9E9E9
| 283821 ||  || — || September 17, 2003 || Kitt Peak || Spacewatch || — || align=right | 2.8 km || 
|-id=822 bgcolor=#E9E9E9
| 283822 ||  || — || September 27, 2003 || Apache Point || SDSS || — || align=right | 1.5 km || 
|-id=823 bgcolor=#E9E9E9
| 283823 ||  || — || September 26, 2003 || Apache Point || SDSS || — || align=right | 3.2 km || 
|-id=824 bgcolor=#E9E9E9
| 283824 ||  || — || October 1, 2003 || Kitt Peak || Spacewatch || — || align=right | 2.1 km || 
|-id=825 bgcolor=#E9E9E9
| 283825 ||  || — || October 4, 2003 || Kitt Peak || Spacewatch || — || align=right | 2.3 km || 
|-id=826 bgcolor=#E9E9E9
| 283826 ||  || — || October 14, 2003 || Anderson Mesa || LONEOS || — || align=right | 1.1 km || 
|-id=827 bgcolor=#FA8072
| 283827 ||  || — || October 15, 2003 || Anderson Mesa || LONEOS || — || align=right | 1.8 km || 
|-id=828 bgcolor=#E9E9E9
| 283828 ||  || — || October 1, 2003 || Kitt Peak || Spacewatch || HEN || align=right | 1.2 km || 
|-id=829 bgcolor=#E9E9E9
| 283829 ||  || — || October 5, 2003 || Kitt Peak || Spacewatch || HNS || align=right | 1.3 km || 
|-id=830 bgcolor=#E9E9E9
| 283830 ||  || — || October 5, 2003 || Kitt Peak || Spacewatch || ADE || align=right | 1.8 km || 
|-id=831 bgcolor=#fefefe
| 283831 ||  || — || October 16, 2003 || Socorro || LINEAR || H || align=right data-sort-value="0.94" | 940 m || 
|-id=832 bgcolor=#E9E9E9
| 283832 ||  || — || October 18, 2003 || Socorro || LINEAR || GER || align=right | 1.7 km || 
|-id=833 bgcolor=#E9E9E9
| 283833 ||  || — || October 19, 2003 || Haleakala || NEAT || — || align=right | 1.4 km || 
|-id=834 bgcolor=#E9E9E9
| 283834 ||  || — || October 16, 2003 || Kitt Peak || Spacewatch || — || align=right | 2.2 km || 
|-id=835 bgcolor=#E9E9E9
| 283835 ||  || — || October 26, 2003 || Catalina || CSS || — || align=right | 1.6 km || 
|-id=836 bgcolor=#E9E9E9
| 283836 ||  || — || October 16, 2003 || Palomar || NEAT || — || align=right | 1.4 km || 
|-id=837 bgcolor=#E9E9E9
| 283837 ||  || — || October 17, 2003 || Anderson Mesa || LONEOS || ADE || align=right | 2.4 km || 
|-id=838 bgcolor=#E9E9E9
| 283838 ||  || — || October 17, 2003 || Anderson Mesa || LONEOS || — || align=right | 1.6 km || 
|-id=839 bgcolor=#E9E9E9
| 283839 ||  || — || October 19, 2003 || Anderson Mesa || LONEOS || — || align=right | 1.1 km || 
|-id=840 bgcolor=#E9E9E9
| 283840 ||  || — || October 20, 2003 || Kitt Peak || Spacewatch || — || align=right | 1.4 km || 
|-id=841 bgcolor=#d6d6d6
| 283841 ||  || — || October 18, 2003 || Palomar || NEAT || — || align=right | 5.5 km || 
|-id=842 bgcolor=#E9E9E9
| 283842 ||  || — || October 19, 2003 || Kitt Peak || Spacewatch || — || align=right | 1.5 km || 
|-id=843 bgcolor=#E9E9E9
| 283843 ||  || — || October 20, 2003 || Socorro || LINEAR || — || align=right | 2.3 km || 
|-id=844 bgcolor=#E9E9E9
| 283844 ||  || — || October 21, 2003 || Socorro || LINEAR || — || align=right | 1.9 km || 
|-id=845 bgcolor=#E9E9E9
| 283845 ||  || — || October 20, 2003 || Socorro || LINEAR || — || align=right | 2.6 km || 
|-id=846 bgcolor=#E9E9E9
| 283846 ||  || — || October 20, 2003 || Palomar || NEAT || — || align=right | 2.0 km || 
|-id=847 bgcolor=#E9E9E9
| 283847 ||  || — || October 21, 2003 || Socorro || LINEAR || — || align=right | 1.1 km || 
|-id=848 bgcolor=#E9E9E9
| 283848 ||  || — || October 18, 2003 || Anderson Mesa || LONEOS || — || align=right | 1.3 km || 
|-id=849 bgcolor=#E9E9E9
| 283849 ||  || — || October 21, 2003 || Socorro || LINEAR || — || align=right | 2.0 km || 
|-id=850 bgcolor=#fefefe
| 283850 ||  || — || October 21, 2003 || Socorro || LINEAR || — || align=right data-sort-value="0.89" | 890 m || 
|-id=851 bgcolor=#E9E9E9
| 283851 ||  || — || October 23, 2003 || Haleakala || NEAT || — || align=right | 2.2 km || 
|-id=852 bgcolor=#E9E9E9
| 283852 ||  || — || October 24, 2003 || Kitt Peak || Spacewatch || — || align=right | 2.3 km || 
|-id=853 bgcolor=#E9E9E9
| 283853 ||  || — || October 25, 2003 || Socorro || LINEAR || — || align=right | 2.6 km || 
|-id=854 bgcolor=#E9E9E9
| 283854 ||  || — || October 30, 2003 || Haleakala || NEAT || — || align=right | 1.6 km || 
|-id=855 bgcolor=#E9E9E9
| 283855 ||  || — || October 30, 2003 || Haleakala || NEAT || — || align=right | 2.0 km || 
|-id=856 bgcolor=#E9E9E9
| 283856 ||  || — || October 18, 2003 || Apache Point || SDSS || — || align=right data-sort-value="0.87" | 870 m || 
|-id=857 bgcolor=#d6d6d6
| 283857 ||  || — || October 19, 2003 || Apache Point || SDSS || BRA || align=right | 2.0 km || 
|-id=858 bgcolor=#E9E9E9
| 283858 ||  || — || November 15, 2003 || Palomar || NEAT || — || align=right | 2.8 km || 
|-id=859 bgcolor=#E9E9E9
| 283859 ||  || — || November 18, 2003 || Kitt Peak || Spacewatch || — || align=right | 3.2 km || 
|-id=860 bgcolor=#E9E9E9
| 283860 ||  || — || November 19, 2003 || Socorro || LINEAR || RAF || align=right | 1.4 km || 
|-id=861 bgcolor=#E9E9E9
| 283861 ||  || — || November 19, 2003 || Kitt Peak || Spacewatch || — || align=right | 1.5 km || 
|-id=862 bgcolor=#E9E9E9
| 283862 ||  || — || November 20, 2003 || Socorro || LINEAR || — || align=right | 2.0 km || 
|-id=863 bgcolor=#E9E9E9
| 283863 ||  || — || November 19, 2003 || Kitt Peak || Spacewatch || — || align=right | 3.0 km || 
|-id=864 bgcolor=#E9E9E9
| 283864 ||  || — || November 20, 2003 || Socorro || LINEAR || — || align=right | 1.1 km || 
|-id=865 bgcolor=#E9E9E9
| 283865 ||  || — || November 19, 2003 || Anderson Mesa || LONEOS || — || align=right | 2.4 km || 
|-id=866 bgcolor=#E9E9E9
| 283866 ||  || — || November 21, 2003 || Socorro || LINEAR || — || align=right | 2.2 km || 
|-id=867 bgcolor=#E9E9E9
| 283867 ||  || — || November 21, 2003 || Socorro || LINEAR || — || align=right | 2.8 km || 
|-id=868 bgcolor=#E9E9E9
| 283868 ||  || — || November 24, 2003 || Anderson Mesa || LONEOS || NEM || align=right | 3.1 km || 
|-id=869 bgcolor=#fefefe
| 283869 ||  || — || November 20, 2003 || Socorro || LINEAR || H || align=right | 1.3 km || 
|-id=870 bgcolor=#E9E9E9
| 283870 ||  || — || November 19, 2003 || Palomar || NEAT || — || align=right | 1.8 km || 
|-id=871 bgcolor=#E9E9E9
| 283871 ||  || — || November 19, 2003 || Palomar || NEAT || — || align=right | 2.2 km || 
|-id=872 bgcolor=#fefefe
| 283872 ||  || — || December 3, 2003 || Anderson Mesa || LONEOS || H || align=right data-sort-value="0.99" | 990 m || 
|-id=873 bgcolor=#d6d6d6
| 283873 ||  || — || December 1, 2003 || Kitt Peak || Spacewatch || — || align=right | 2.4 km || 
|-id=874 bgcolor=#E9E9E9
| 283874 ||  || — || December 16, 2003 || Anderson Mesa || LONEOS || — || align=right | 3.8 km || 
|-id=875 bgcolor=#E9E9E9
| 283875 ||  || — || December 17, 2003 || Palomar || NEAT || — || align=right | 4.1 km || 
|-id=876 bgcolor=#E9E9E9
| 283876 ||  || — || December 19, 2003 || Socorro || LINEAR || — || align=right | 2.0 km || 
|-id=877 bgcolor=#E9E9E9
| 283877 ||  || — || December 19, 2003 || Socorro || LINEAR || GAL || align=right | 2.5 km || 
|-id=878 bgcolor=#E9E9E9
| 283878 ||  || — || December 19, 2003 || Socorro || LINEAR || ADE || align=right | 3.2 km || 
|-id=879 bgcolor=#d6d6d6
| 283879 ||  || — || December 24, 2003 || Haleakala || NEAT || — || align=right | 3.6 km || 
|-id=880 bgcolor=#d6d6d6
| 283880 ||  || — || December 29, 2003 || Socorro || LINEAR || — || align=right | 5.6 km || 
|-id=881 bgcolor=#E9E9E9
| 283881 ||  || — || December 17, 2003 || Kitt Peak || Spacewatch || — || align=right | 3.4 km || 
|-id=882 bgcolor=#E9E9E9
| 283882 ||  || — || December 17, 2003 || Palomar || NEAT || — || align=right | 2.7 km || 
|-id=883 bgcolor=#d6d6d6
| 283883 ||  || — || December 22, 2003 || Socorro || LINEAR || — || align=right | 3.9 km || 
|-id=884 bgcolor=#E9E9E9
| 283884 ||  || — || January 17, 2004 || Palomar || NEAT || — || align=right | 3.5 km || 
|-id=885 bgcolor=#d6d6d6
| 283885 ||  || — || January 22, 2004 || Socorro || LINEAR || MEL || align=right | 3.6 km || 
|-id=886 bgcolor=#d6d6d6
| 283886 ||  || — || January 22, 2004 || Socorro || LINEAR || — || align=right | 3.0 km || 
|-id=887 bgcolor=#FA8072
| 283887 ||  || — || January 27, 2004 || Socorro || LINEAR || — || align=right | 2.3 km || 
|-id=888 bgcolor=#E9E9E9
| 283888 ||  || — || January 22, 2004 || Socorro || LINEAR || DOR || align=right | 3.9 km || 
|-id=889 bgcolor=#FA8072
| 283889 ||  || — || January 23, 2004 || Socorro || LINEAR || — || align=right | 1.3 km || 
|-id=890 bgcolor=#E9E9E9
| 283890 ||  || — || January 29, 2004 || Socorro || LINEAR || GAL || align=right | 2.3 km || 
|-id=891 bgcolor=#d6d6d6
| 283891 ||  || — || January 16, 2004 || Kitt Peak || Spacewatch || KAR || align=right | 1.1 km || 
|-id=892 bgcolor=#d6d6d6
| 283892 ||  || — || January 27, 2004 || Kitt Peak || Spacewatch || EOS || align=right | 2.2 km || 
|-id=893 bgcolor=#d6d6d6
| 283893 ||  || — || February 10, 2004 || Catalina || CSS || — || align=right | 3.8 km || 
|-id=894 bgcolor=#d6d6d6
| 283894 ||  || — || February 11, 2004 || Anderson Mesa || LONEOS || — || align=right | 3.2 km || 
|-id=895 bgcolor=#d6d6d6
| 283895 ||  || — || February 11, 2004 || Kitt Peak || Spacewatch || — || align=right | 3.7 km || 
|-id=896 bgcolor=#d6d6d6
| 283896 ||  || — || February 11, 2004 || Kitt Peak || Spacewatch || — || align=right | 7.9 km || 
|-id=897 bgcolor=#d6d6d6
| 283897 ||  || — || February 14, 2004 || Haleakala || NEAT || TIR || align=right | 2.4 km || 
|-id=898 bgcolor=#d6d6d6
| 283898 ||  || — || February 13, 2004 || Palomar || NEAT || TIR || align=right | 3.7 km || 
|-id=899 bgcolor=#d6d6d6
| 283899 ||  || — || February 14, 2004 || Catalina || CSS || TIR || align=right | 4.2 km || 
|-id=900 bgcolor=#d6d6d6
| 283900 ||  || — || February 17, 2004 || Kitt Peak || Spacewatch || — || align=right | 4.9 km || 
|}

283901–284000 

|-bgcolor=#d6d6d6
| 283901 ||  || — || February 17, 2004 || Kitt Peak || Spacewatch || — || align=right | 3.7 km || 
|-id=902 bgcolor=#d6d6d6
| 283902 ||  || — || February 17, 2004 || Kitt Peak || Spacewatch || — || align=right | 3.8 km || 
|-id=903 bgcolor=#fefefe
| 283903 ||  || — || February 23, 2004 || Socorro || LINEAR || — || align=right data-sort-value="0.87" | 870 m || 
|-id=904 bgcolor=#fefefe
| 283904 ||  || — || February 23, 2004 || Socorro || LINEAR || — || align=right data-sort-value="0.89" | 890 m || 
|-id=905 bgcolor=#fefefe
| 283905 ||  || — || March 15, 2004 || Catalina || CSS || NYS || align=right data-sort-value="0.85" | 850 m || 
|-id=906 bgcolor=#fefefe
| 283906 ||  || — || March 15, 2004 || Kitt Peak || Spacewatch || — || align=right data-sort-value="0.76" | 760 m || 
|-id=907 bgcolor=#fefefe
| 283907 ||  || — || March 15, 2004 || Socorro || LINEAR || — || align=right data-sort-value="0.62" | 620 m || 
|-id=908 bgcolor=#d6d6d6
| 283908 ||  || — || March 16, 2004 || Socorro || LINEAR || LIX || align=right | 5.1 km || 
|-id=909 bgcolor=#d6d6d6
| 283909 ||  || — || March 16, 2004 || Kitt Peak || Spacewatch || EOS || align=right | 2.2 km || 
|-id=910 bgcolor=#fefefe
| 283910 ||  || — || March 17, 2004 || Kitt Peak || Spacewatch || FLO || align=right data-sort-value="0.59" | 590 m || 
|-id=911 bgcolor=#fefefe
| 283911 ||  || — || March 17, 2004 || Socorro || LINEAR || FLO || align=right data-sort-value="0.76" | 760 m || 
|-id=912 bgcolor=#d6d6d6
| 283912 ||  || — || March 26, 2004 || Socorro || LINEAR || LIX || align=right | 6.6 km || 
|-id=913 bgcolor=#d6d6d6
| 283913 ||  || — || March 26, 2004 || Kitt Peak || Spacewatch || EOS || align=right | 2.6 km || 
|-id=914 bgcolor=#fefefe
| 283914 ||  || — || March 23, 2004 || Socorro || LINEAR || — || align=right | 1.00 km || 
|-id=915 bgcolor=#d6d6d6
| 283915 ||  || — || March 27, 2004 || Socorro || LINEAR || — || align=right | 2.9 km || 
|-id=916 bgcolor=#fefefe
| 283916 ||  || — || March 27, 2004 || Socorro || LINEAR || — || align=right data-sort-value="0.82" | 820 m || 
|-id=917 bgcolor=#d6d6d6
| 283917 ||  || — || March 28, 2004 || Kitt Peak || Spacewatch || — || align=right | 3.3 km || 
|-id=918 bgcolor=#fefefe
| 283918 ||  || — || April 15, 2004 || Anderson Mesa || LONEOS || — || align=right | 1.00 km || 
|-id=919 bgcolor=#fefefe
| 283919 ||  || — || April 16, 2004 || Kitt Peak || Spacewatch || FLO || align=right data-sort-value="0.73" | 730 m || 
|-id=920 bgcolor=#fefefe
| 283920 ||  || — || April 19, 2004 || Socorro || LINEAR || MAS || align=right data-sort-value="0.88" | 880 m || 
|-id=921 bgcolor=#d6d6d6
| 283921 ||  || — || April 25, 2004 || Catalina || CSS || — || align=right | 3.9 km || 
|-id=922 bgcolor=#fefefe
| 283922 ||  || — || April 23, 2004 || Socorro || LINEAR || FLO || align=right data-sort-value="0.92" | 920 m || 
|-id=923 bgcolor=#fefefe
| 283923 ||  || — || May 15, 2004 || Socorro || LINEAR || — || align=right | 1.1 km || 
|-id=924 bgcolor=#fefefe
| 283924 ||  || — || May 19, 2004 || Kitt Peak || Spacewatch || — || align=right data-sort-value="0.88" | 880 m || 
|-id=925 bgcolor=#fefefe
| 283925 ||  || — || June 9, 2004 || Kitt Peak || Spacewatch || V || align=right data-sort-value="0.90" | 900 m || 
|-id=926 bgcolor=#fefefe
| 283926 ||  || — || July 14, 2004 || Reedy Creek || J. Broughton || — || align=right data-sort-value="0.92" | 920 m || 
|-id=927 bgcolor=#fefefe
| 283927 ||  || — || July 11, 2004 || Socorro || LINEAR || — || align=right data-sort-value="0.98" | 980 m || 
|-id=928 bgcolor=#fefefe
| 283928 ||  || — || July 16, 2004 || Socorro || LINEAR || — || align=right data-sort-value="0.90" | 900 m || 
|-id=929 bgcolor=#fefefe
| 283929 ||  || — || August 6, 2004 || Reedy Creek || J. Broughton || NYS || align=right data-sort-value="0.87" | 870 m || 
|-id=930 bgcolor=#fefefe
| 283930 ||  || — || August 6, 2004 || Palomar || NEAT || NYS || align=right data-sort-value="0.76" | 760 m || 
|-id=931 bgcolor=#fefefe
| 283931 ||  || — || August 8, 2004 || Socorro || LINEAR || — || align=right | 1.2 km || 
|-id=932 bgcolor=#fefefe
| 283932 ||  || — || August 8, 2004 || Anderson Mesa || LONEOS || — || align=right | 1.1 km || 
|-id=933 bgcolor=#fefefe
| 283933 ||  || — || August 8, 2004 || Socorro || LINEAR || — || align=right data-sort-value="0.98" | 980 m || 
|-id=934 bgcolor=#fefefe
| 283934 ||  || — || August 8, 2004 || Socorro || LINEAR || — || align=right data-sort-value="0.87" | 870 m || 
|-id=935 bgcolor=#fefefe
| 283935 ||  || — || August 8, 2004 || Socorro || LINEAR || NYS || align=right data-sort-value="0.83" | 830 m || 
|-id=936 bgcolor=#fefefe
| 283936 ||  || — || August 8, 2004 || Anderson Mesa || LONEOS || — || align=right data-sort-value="0.90" | 900 m || 
|-id=937 bgcolor=#fefefe
| 283937 ||  || — || August 8, 2004 || Anderson Mesa || LONEOS || — || align=right | 1.4 km || 
|-id=938 bgcolor=#fefefe
| 283938 ||  || — || August 9, 2004 || Socorro || LINEAR || V || align=right data-sort-value="0.94" | 940 m || 
|-id=939 bgcolor=#fefefe
| 283939 ||  || — || August 8, 2004 || Socorro || LINEAR || FLO || align=right data-sort-value="0.94" | 940 m || 
|-id=940 bgcolor=#fefefe
| 283940 ||  || — || August 8, 2004 || Anderson Mesa || LONEOS || — || align=right | 1.1 km || 
|-id=941 bgcolor=#fefefe
| 283941 ||  || — || August 9, 2004 || Anderson Mesa || LONEOS || — || align=right | 1.0 km || 
|-id=942 bgcolor=#fefefe
| 283942 ||  || — || August 9, 2004 || Socorro || LINEAR || V || align=right data-sort-value="0.85" | 850 m || 
|-id=943 bgcolor=#fefefe
| 283943 ||  || — || August 9, 2004 || Socorro || LINEAR || — || align=right | 1.0 km || 
|-id=944 bgcolor=#fefefe
| 283944 ||  || — || August 10, 2004 || Socorro || LINEAR || NYS || align=right data-sort-value="0.83" | 830 m || 
|-id=945 bgcolor=#fefefe
| 283945 ||  || — || August 10, 2004 || Socorro || LINEAR || critical || align=right data-sort-value="0.78" | 780 m || 
|-id=946 bgcolor=#fefefe
| 283946 ||  || — || August 10, 2004 || Socorro || LINEAR || NYS || align=right data-sort-value="0.80" | 800 m || 
|-id=947 bgcolor=#fefefe
| 283947 ||  || — || August 10, 2004 || Socorro || LINEAR || — || align=right | 1.6 km || 
|-id=948 bgcolor=#FA8072
| 283948 ||  || — || August 10, 2004 || Socorro || LINEAR || — || align=right | 1.00 km || 
|-id=949 bgcolor=#fefefe
| 283949 ||  || — || August 10, 2004 || Socorro || LINEAR || FLO || align=right data-sort-value="0.77" | 770 m || 
|-id=950 bgcolor=#fefefe
| 283950 ||  || — || August 12, 2004 || Socorro || LINEAR || — || align=right | 1.5 km || 
|-id=951 bgcolor=#fefefe
| 283951 ||  || — || August 13, 2004 || Palomar || NEAT || V || align=right data-sort-value="0.73" | 730 m || 
|-id=952 bgcolor=#fefefe
| 283952 ||  || — || August 19, 2004 || Socorro || LINEAR || — || align=right | 1.8 km || 
|-id=953 bgcolor=#fefefe
| 283953 ||  || — || August 21, 2004 || Catalina || CSS || — || align=right data-sort-value="0.82" | 820 m || 
|-id=954 bgcolor=#fefefe
| 283954 ||  || — || August 22, 2004 || Bergisch Gladbac || W. Bickel || NYS || align=right data-sort-value="0.78" | 780 m || 
|-id=955 bgcolor=#fefefe
| 283955 ||  || — || August 21, 2004 || Goodricke-Pigott || Goodricke-Pigott Obs. || ERI || align=right | 1.9 km || 
|-id=956 bgcolor=#fefefe
| 283956 ||  || — || August 27, 2004 || Socorro || LINEAR || PHO || align=right | 2.1 km || 
|-id=957 bgcolor=#fefefe
| 283957 || 2004 RF || — || September 1, 2004 || Great Shefford || P. Birtwhistle || V || align=right data-sort-value="0.87" | 870 m || 
|-id=958 bgcolor=#FA8072
| 283958 ||  || — || September 4, 2004 || Needville || Needville Obs. || H || align=right data-sort-value="0.60" | 600 m || 
|-id=959 bgcolor=#fefefe
| 283959 ||  || — || September 4, 2004 || Palomar || NEAT || FLO || align=right data-sort-value="0.83" | 830 m || 
|-id=960 bgcolor=#fefefe
| 283960 ||  || — || September 4, 2004 || Palomar || NEAT || FLO || align=right data-sort-value="0.86" | 860 m || 
|-id=961 bgcolor=#fefefe
| 283961 ||  || — || September 7, 2004 || Kitt Peak || Spacewatch || — || align=right data-sort-value="0.89" | 890 m || 
|-id=962 bgcolor=#fefefe
| 283962 ||  || — || September 7, 2004 || Kitt Peak || Spacewatch || — || align=right data-sort-value="0.75" | 750 m || 
|-id=963 bgcolor=#fefefe
| 283963 ||  || — || September 6, 2004 || Siding Spring || SSS || NYS || align=right data-sort-value="0.60" | 600 m || 
|-id=964 bgcolor=#fefefe
| 283964 ||  || — || September 8, 2004 || Socorro || LINEAR || NYS || align=right data-sort-value="0.74" | 740 m || 
|-id=965 bgcolor=#fefefe
| 283965 ||  || — || September 8, 2004 || Socorro || LINEAR || MAS || align=right data-sort-value="0.86" | 860 m || 
|-id=966 bgcolor=#fefefe
| 283966 ||  || — || September 8, 2004 || Socorro || LINEAR || — || align=right data-sort-value="0.98" | 980 m || 
|-id=967 bgcolor=#fefefe
| 283967 ||  || — || September 8, 2004 || Socorro || LINEAR || — || align=right | 1.1 km || 
|-id=968 bgcolor=#fefefe
| 283968 ||  || — || September 8, 2004 || Socorro || LINEAR || NYS || align=right data-sort-value="0.80" | 800 m || 
|-id=969 bgcolor=#fefefe
| 283969 ||  || — || September 8, 2004 || Socorro || LINEAR || MAS || align=right data-sort-value="0.94" | 940 m || 
|-id=970 bgcolor=#fefefe
| 283970 ||  || — || September 9, 2004 || Socorro || LINEAR || NYS || align=right data-sort-value="0.65" | 650 m || 
|-id=971 bgcolor=#fefefe
| 283971 ||  || — || September 8, 2004 || Socorro || LINEAR || — || align=right | 1.1 km || 
|-id=972 bgcolor=#fefefe
| 283972 ||  || — || September 8, 2004 || Socorro || LINEAR || — || align=right | 1.1 km || 
|-id=973 bgcolor=#fefefe
| 283973 ||  || — || September 11, 2004 || Socorro || LINEAR || H || align=right | 1.0 km || 
|-id=974 bgcolor=#fefefe
| 283974 ||  || — || September 9, 2004 || Socorro || LINEAR || V || align=right data-sort-value="0.85" | 850 m || 
|-id=975 bgcolor=#fefefe
| 283975 ||  || — || September 10, 2004 || Socorro || LINEAR || V || align=right data-sort-value="0.81" | 810 m || 
|-id=976 bgcolor=#fefefe
| 283976 ||  || — || September 10, 2004 || Socorro || LINEAR || NYS || align=right data-sort-value="0.72" | 720 m || 
|-id=977 bgcolor=#E9E9E9
| 283977 ||  || — || September 11, 2004 || Kitt Peak || Spacewatch || — || align=right | 1.2 km || 
|-id=978 bgcolor=#fefefe
| 283978 ||  || — || September 8, 2004 || Socorro || LINEAR || V || align=right data-sort-value="0.78" | 780 m || 
|-id=979 bgcolor=#fefefe
| 283979 ||  || — || September 8, 2004 || Apache Point || Apache Point Obs. || — || align=right data-sort-value="0.89" | 890 m || 
|-id=980 bgcolor=#fefefe
| 283980 ||  || — || September 9, 2004 || Kitt Peak || Spacewatch || V || align=right data-sort-value="0.90" | 900 m || 
|-id=981 bgcolor=#fefefe
| 283981 ||  || — || September 10, 2004 || Socorro || LINEAR || V || align=right data-sort-value="0.92" | 920 m || 
|-id=982 bgcolor=#fefefe
| 283982 ||  || — || September 10, 2004 || Socorro || LINEAR || V || align=right data-sort-value="0.86" | 860 m || 
|-id=983 bgcolor=#fefefe
| 283983 ||  || — || September 10, 2004 || Socorro || LINEAR || — || align=right | 1.1 km || 
|-id=984 bgcolor=#fefefe
| 283984 ||  || — || September 10, 2004 || Socorro || LINEAR || V || align=right data-sort-value="0.99" | 990 m || 
|-id=985 bgcolor=#fefefe
| 283985 ||  || — || September 3, 2004 || Palomar || NEAT || PHO || align=right | 1.8 km || 
|-id=986 bgcolor=#fefefe
| 283986 ||  || — || September 8, 2004 || Palomar || NEAT || — || align=right data-sort-value="0.90" | 900 m || 
|-id=987 bgcolor=#fefefe
| 283987 ||  || — || September 10, 2004 || Kitt Peak || Spacewatch || — || align=right data-sort-value="0.71" | 710 m || 
|-id=988 bgcolor=#fefefe
| 283988 ||  || — || September 13, 2004 || Palomar || NEAT || MAS || align=right data-sort-value="0.97" | 970 m || 
|-id=989 bgcolor=#fefefe
| 283989 ||  || — || September 13, 2004 || Socorro || LINEAR || — || align=right | 3.0 km || 
|-id=990 bgcolor=#fefefe
| 283990 Randallrosenfeld ||  ||  || September 16, 2004 || Jarnac || T. Glinos, W. Levy || MAS || align=right data-sort-value="0.86" | 860 m || 
|-id=991 bgcolor=#fefefe
| 283991 ||  || — || September 17, 2004 || Socorro || LINEAR || — || align=right | 1.2 km || 
|-id=992 bgcolor=#d6d6d6
| 283992 ||  || — || September 17, 2004 || Socorro || LINEAR || SHU3:2 || align=right | 7.2 km || 
|-id=993 bgcolor=#fefefe
| 283993 ||  || — || September 18, 2004 || Socorro || LINEAR || — || align=right data-sort-value="0.94" | 940 m || 
|-id=994 bgcolor=#fefefe
| 283994 ||  || — || October 4, 2004 || Kitt Peak || Spacewatch || NYS || align=right data-sort-value="0.88" | 880 m || 
|-id=995 bgcolor=#fefefe
| 283995 ||  || — || October 4, 2004 || Kitt Peak || Spacewatch || NYS || align=right data-sort-value="0.79" | 790 m || 
|-id=996 bgcolor=#fefefe
| 283996 ||  || — || October 4, 2004 || Kitt Peak || Spacewatch || NYS || align=right data-sort-value="0.79" | 790 m || 
|-id=997 bgcolor=#fefefe
| 283997 ||  || — || October 4, 2004 || Kitt Peak || Spacewatch || — || align=right | 1.4 km || 
|-id=998 bgcolor=#fefefe
| 283998 ||  || — || October 4, 2004 || Kitt Peak || Spacewatch || MAS || align=right data-sort-value="0.88" | 880 m || 
|-id=999 bgcolor=#fefefe
| 283999 ||  || — || October 5, 2004 || Anderson Mesa || LONEOS || — || align=right | 1.2 km || 
|-id=000 bgcolor=#fefefe
| 284000 ||  || — || October 5, 2004 || Kitt Peak || Spacewatch || MAS || align=right data-sort-value="0.74" | 740 m || 
|}

References

External links 
 Discovery Circumstances: Numbered Minor Planets (280001)–(285000) (IAU Minor Planet Center)

0283